= List of biotech and pharmaceutical companies in the New York metropolitan area =

Biotech and pharmaceutical companies in the New York metropolitan area represent a significant and growing economic component of the New York metropolitan area, the most populous combined statistical area in the United States and one of the most populous megacities in the world.

The biotechnology sector is growing in the New York City area, based upon the region's strength in academic scientific research and public and commercial financial support. By mid-2014, Accelerator, a biotech investment firm, had raised more than US$30 million from investors, including Eli Lilly and Company, Pfizer, and Johnson & Johnson, for initial funding to create biotechnology startups at the Alexandria Center for Life Science, which encompasses more than 700,000 square feet (65,000 m^{2}) on East 29th Street and promotes collaboration among scientists and entrepreneurs at the center and with nearby academic, medical, and research institutions. The New York City Economic Development Corporation's Early Stage Life Sciences Funding Initiative and venture capital partners, including Celgene, General Electric Ventures, and Eli Lilly, committed a minimum of US$100 million to help launch 15 to 20 ventures in life sciences and biotechnology in 2014, and in January 2018, the City of New York itself committed up to US$100 million into the venture.

In December 2014, the State of New York announced a US$50 million venture capital fund to encourage enterprises working in biotechnology and advanced materials; according to Governor Andrew Cuomo, the seed money would facilitate entrepreneurs in bringing their research into the marketplace.

New Jersey has a nickname "Medicine Chest of the World" due to its large workforce in biopharmaceutical industry. As of 2019, twelve of top 20 biopharmaceutical companies in the world has U.S. headquarters in the state.

Below is a list of notable New York metropolitan area biotechnology and pharmaceutical corporations, including companies with either global or U.S. headquarters in the metropolitan region encompassing and surrounding New York City.

== Biotechnology ==
=== Connecticut ===
- Arvinas
- Biohaven
- Loxo Oncology
- Purdue Pharma
- SpringWorks Therapeutics

=== New Jersey ===
- Acino
- Adma Biologics
- Aerie Pharmaceuticals
- AIM ImmunoTech
- Akorn
- Akrimax
- Allergan
- Alvogen
- Amarin
- Amicus Therapeutics
- Amneal Pharmaceuticals
- Angel Medical Systems
- Apicore
- Aphena Pharma Solutions
- Aquestive Therapeutics
- Ascendia Pharmaceuticals
- Aucta Pharmaceuticals
- AustarPharma
- Bausch & Lomb
- Becton Dickinson
- Belrose Pharma
- Bezwada Biomedical
- BioAegis Therapeutics
- BrainStorm Cell Therapeutics
- Bristol-Myers Squibb
- Cambrex
- Cancer Genetics
- Castle Creek Pharma
- Catalent
- Celerion
- Celgene
- Celldex Therapeutics
- Celvive
- Certara
- Champions Oncology
- ChromoCell
- Chugai Pharma
- Citius Pharmaceuticals
- Citron Pharma
- Collagen matrix
- ContraVir
- C.R. Bard
- Crystal Pharmatech
- Cyclacel Pharmaceuticals
- Diagenode
- DPT Laboratories
- Dr. Reddy's Laboratories
- Drais Pharmaceuticals
- EAG Laboratories
- Elite Pharmaceuticals
- Emergent BioSolutions
- Endomedix
- Enzon Pharmaceuticals
- Ethicon Inc.
- Ferring Pharmaceuticals
- Frontage
- Genewiz
- Genmab
- GenScript
- Glenmark Pharmaceuticals
- Global Pharma Tek
- Grace Therapeutics
- Helsinn
- Heritage Pharmaceuticals
- Hovione
- Hudson BioPharma
- Immunomedics
- Impax Laboratories
- Integra Life Sciences
- Intercept Pharmaceuticals
- Kashiv Pharma
- LabVantage
- Leading Pharma
- Lonza
- MakroCare
- Medicure
- Menssana Research
- Mitsubishi Tanabe Pharma
- Ohm Laboratories
- Oncobiologics
- Ortho Clinical Diagnostics
- Orthobond
- Oyster Point Pharma
- Palatin Technologies
- Parexel
- PBL Assay Science
- PDS Biotechnology
- Pearl Therapeutics (AstraZeneca)
- Pentax Medical Americas
- Pernix Therapeutics Holdings
- Pharsight
- Phibro Animal Health
- Photocure
- Precision Oncology
- Prolong Pharmaceuticals
- Promius Pharma
- PTC Therapeutics
- QPharma Morristown
- Raphael Pharmaceuticals
- RiconPharma
- Roche Molecular Systems
- Salvona
- Sandoz (Novartis)
- Scienion
- Shionogi
- Soligenix
- Stryker
- Sun Pharmaceuticals
- Scynexis
- Taiho Oncology
- Tara Innovations
- Terumo Medical
- 3D Biotek
- The Medicines Company
- ThromboGenics
- TKL Research
- Tris Pharma
- Validus Pharmaceuticals
- VaxInnate
- West-Ward (HIKMA)
- WuXi Biologics
- Worthington Biochemical
- XenoBiotic Laboratories (WuXi Apptec)
- Zoetis

=== New York ===
- AccuVein
- Aceto
- Acorda Therapeutics
- Actinium Pharmaceuticals
- Affina Biotechnologies
- AJES Life Sciences
- Akari Therapeutics
- Alpha-1 Biologics
- American Regent
- Amicus Therapeutics
- Anavex Life Sciences
- Angion Biomedica
- Applied DNA Sciences
- Armgo Pharma
- Axios Oncology
- Axovant Sciences
- Azure Biotech
- AzurRx Biopharma
- Bantam Pharmaceutical
- Bioreclamation
- BioSpecifics
- Caladrius Biosciences
- Cellectis
- Certerra
- Chembio Diagnostic Systems
- Clinilabs
- Clinuvel Pharmaceuticals
- Codagenix
- ContraFect
- Charles River Laboratories
- Creative Biogene
- Creative Biolabs
- Creative Enzymes
- Cynvec
- DanDrit
- Dipexium Pharmaceuticals
- Dompé
- Ember Therapeutics
- Endo Pharmaceuticals
- Envisagenics
- Gene Link
- Iberica US
- iCell Gene Therapeutics
- ICON Clinical Research
- Immtech Pharmaceuticals
- Intellect Neurosciences
- Innovimmune Biotherapeutics
- Intra-Cellular Therapies
- Kallyope
- Kyras Therapeutics
- Lucerna
- Mesoblast
- Microlin Bio
- MindMed Inc.
- Mispro Biotech
- Motif BioSciences
- Lixte Biotechnology
- Ohr Pharmaceuticals
- Oligomerix
- Ovid Therapeutics
- Progyny
- Prophetic
- PsychoGenics
- Q BioMed
- Relmada Therapeutics
- Regeneron Pharmaceuticals
- RGenix
- S1 Biopharma
- Seelos Therapeutics
- Siga
- SolveBio
- Synergy Pharmaceuticals
- Tactical Therapeutics
- Tara Biosystems
- TechnoVax
- TG Therapeutics
- Tonix Pharmaceuticals
- Travere Therapeutics
- Savage Laboratories (Fougera)
- Theragnostic Technologies
- TheraSource
- United Biomedical

== Pharmaceutical corporations ==
=== Connecticut ===
- Boehringer Ingelheim

=== New Jersey ===
- Aurobindo Pharma
- Barr Pharmaceuticals
- Bayer
- Daiichi Sankyo
- Eisai
- Eli Lilly and Company
- Janssen Pharmaceuticals (J&J)
- Johnson & Johnson
- Merck & Co.
- Novartis Pharmaceuticals
- Orexo
- Ortho-McNeil Pharmaceutical (J&J)
- Paion
- Par Pharmaceutical
- Sanofi
- Teva (planned move to Parsippany-Troy Hills, New Jersey)
- The Medicines Company
- Valeant
- Zoetis

=== New York ===
- Pfizer
- Turing Pharmaceuticals

== See also ==
- Tech companies in the New York metropolitan area
