= Gitlow =

Gitlow is a surname. Notable people with the surname include:

- Benjamin Gitlow (1891–1965), American politician and author
- Stuart Gitlow (born 1962), American psychiatrist

== See also ==
- Gitlow v. New York
