= Avalere Health =

Health care business consulting firm

- Formerly: Fishawack Health, The Health Strategies Consultancy LLC
- Type: Subsidiary
- Industry: Healthcare consulting
- Founded: 2000
- Founder: Dan Mendelson
- Headquarters: London, England, UK
- Services: Advisory, Medical, and Marketing services for the life sciences and healthcare industry
- Parent: Bridgepoint Group
- Website: avalerehealth.com

Avalere Health is a global strategic healthcare consulting firm that offers advisory, medical, and marketing services. It is headquartered in London and specializes in strategy, medical communications, policy, data analysis, and marketing services for life sciences, health plans, providers, government agencies, and industry associations.

== History ==
Avalere was founded as The Health Strategies Consultancy LLC in 2000 by Dan Mendelson. In 2008, Mendelson sold a minority interest of the company to ABS Capital Partners, a Baltimore, Maryland–based private equity firm. In 2015, the Maryland-based technology company Inovalon (Nasdaq: INOV) acquired Avalere Health. Avalere operated as a subsidiary with a focus on providing advisory services on market consolidation, cost management, quality improvement, and managed care as well as business intelligence and corporate communication strategies. The firm has also published studies on drug plan coverage and managed care plans in the US.

In 2022, Avalere Health was acquired by Fishawack Health, a UK biopharma agency owned by the private equity firm Bridgepoint Group. In 2023, Fishawack Health rebranded itself to Avalere Health . Today, Avalere Health is a global strategic partner that offers advisory, medical, and marketing services to clients in the US and globally, and with offices in the US, UK, Greece, Ireland, Singapore, and Japan.
