= Alcon =

Swiss-American pharmaceutical and medical device company

Alcon Inc.
- Native name: Alcon AG
- Type: Public
- Traded as: SIX: ALC; NYSE: ALC
- Industry: Ophthalmology
- Founded: 1945; 81 years ago in Fort Worth, Texas, US
- Headquarters: Geneva, Switzerland
- Key people: David Endicott (CEO)
- Products: Surgical products; Contact lenses; Over-the-counter products
- Revenue: ▲US$9.91 billion (2024)
- Operating income: ▲US$1.41 billion (2024)
- Net income: ▲US$1.02 billion (2024)
- Total assets: ▲US$30.3 billion (2024)
- Total equity: ▲US$21.6 billion (2024)
- Number of employees: 25,599 (FTE, 2024)
- Website: alcon.com

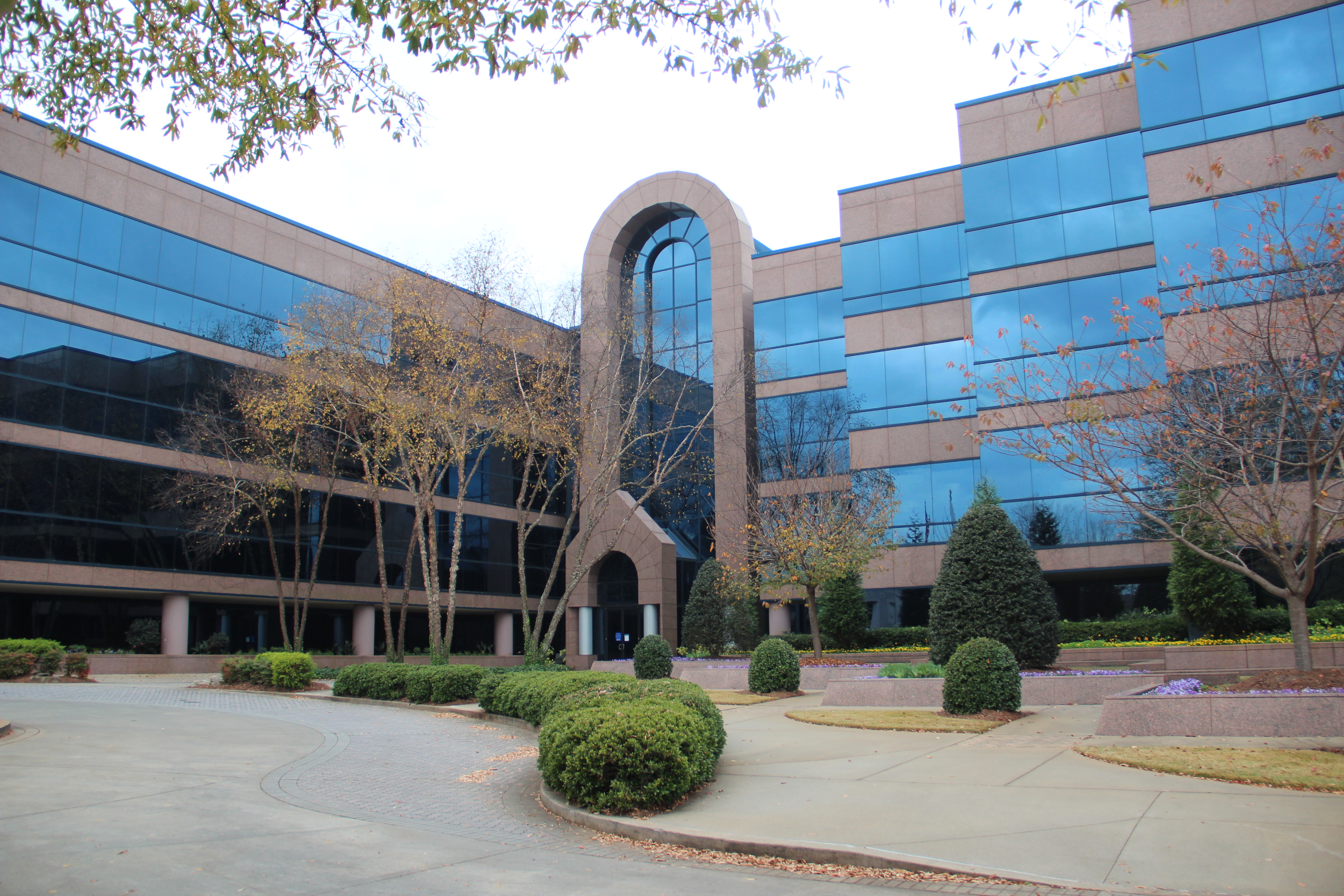
Alcon offices in Johns Creek, Georgia

Alcon Inc. (German: Alcon AG) is a Swiss-American pharmaceutical and medical device company specializing in eye care products. Alcon is incorporated in the Canton of Fribourg, Switzerland, and its global headquarters are located in Geneva, but its main operational base is in Fort Worth, Texas, United States, where it employs about 4,500 people.

Alcon was a subsidiary of Novartis until April 2019, when it was spun out into a separate publicly traded company. Alcon itself has a number of subsidiaries, including Aerie Pharmaceuticals, focused on therapies for glaucoma and other diseases of the eye, and WaveLight, which develops and manufactures laser eye surgery technologies.

== History ==
Alcon was founded in 1945 as a small pharmacy in Fort Worth, Texas, United States. It was named for its founders, pharmacists Robert Alexander and William Conner who focused on sterile ophthalmic products.

Nestlé of Switzerland purchased Alcon in 1977. Alcon expanded its manufacturing capability with new plants in South America and Europe and drastically increased its investment in research.

In 1979, Alcon acquired Texas Pharmacal Company which became Dermatological Products of Texas (and is now DPT Laboratories).

In 1984, Alcon founded the Technical Excellence Award to promote achievements in R&D excellence and has awarded it to more than 100 recipients. The Alcon product line has expanded from pharmaceuticals to the surgical arena. Today, Alcon has operations in 75 countries and its products are sold in over 180 countries.

Nestlé conducted an initial public offering of 25% of its stake in Alcon in 2002. The stock is traded under the ticker symbol ALC. In July 2008, Novartis purchased approximately 25% of Nestlé's stake in Alcon, with an option to buy Nestlé's remaining shares beginning in 2010. Novartis bought 52% stake from Nestlé for $28.1 Billion. This deal brought the total ownership of Alcon by Novartis to 77%. Beginning January 2010 Novartis formally announced it will be completing the exercise options for finishing purchasing the rest of Alcon and then promptly continue to exercise merger and takeover of Alcon.

On March 29, 2010, Alcon acquired Durezol and Zyclorin from Sirion Therapeutics. Alcon received regulatory approval to acquire the rights of Durezol emulsion in the US and the global rights, excluding Latin America, for Zyclorin from Sirion Therapeutics.

On April 9, 2019, Alcon completed a 100% spin-off from Novartis. The new standalone company is worth up to 28 billion Swiss francs.

In November 2021, Alcon announced it would acquire Ivantis and their glaucoma surgery stent technology for at least $475 million. In August 2022, Alcon agreed to buy Aerie Pharmaceuticals for US$770 million to enhance its ophthalmic pharmaceutical portfolio.

In March 2025, Alcon announced its acquisition of LENSAR, maker of the ALLY Robotic Cataract Laser Treatment System, for $356 million, with the transaction expected to close in the second half of 2025.

In September 2025, Alcon announced the acquisition of LumiThera, Inc., a leader in light-based innovations for ophthalmology.
