= Inovalon =

American technology company

- Trade name: Inovalon Holdings, Inc.
- Formerly: MedAssurant
- Type: Private
- Traded as: Nasdaq: INOV
- Industry: Technology
- Founded: 1998; 28 years ago, in Maryland, U.S.
- Founder: Keith Dunleavy, M.D.
- Headquarters: Bowie, Maryland, U.S.
- Area served: United States; Puerto Rico
- Key people: Adam Kansler (CEO)
- Revenue: ▲US$ 527,676,000 (2018); US$ 449,358,000 (2017); US$ 427,588,000 (2016)
- Owner: Nordic Capital; Insight Partners
- Number of employees: 2,500

Inovalon is an American technology company that provides cloud-based tools for healthcare.

== History ==
The company was founded in 1998 in Maryland as MedAssurant by Keith Dunleavy, MD. In June 2012, the company changed its name to Inovalon. The company publicly filed its registration statement with the Securities and Exchange Commission (SEC) on December 30, 2014 for a proposed initial public offering of its common stock and applied for listing on NASDAQ under the ticker "INOV". Inovalon went public and began trading on the NASDAQ exchange on April 12, 2015 The company's stock traded until November 2021 when the company was taken private with its acquisition by Nordic Capital and Insight Partners.

In August 2023, Inovalon's former CEO Keith Dunleavy was inducted into the Dartmouth Entrepreneur Hall of Fame.

Adam Kansler was appointed CEO of Inovalon on January 28, 2025. Kansler served as President of S&P Global Market Intelligence, also served as President of the Financial Services division and member of the executive team for IHS Markit as well as with the law firm of Proskauer LLP.

== Partnerships and acquisitions ==
In 2012, Inovalon partnered with industry researchers to conduct a study on Hospital Readmission Rates in Medicare Advantage Plans to track readmission rates among patients enrolled in Medicare’s private comprehensive Medicare Advantage plans, and develop initial comparisons with fee-for-service (FFS) readmission rates. The study was published in The American Journal of Managed Care.

In 2013, Inovalon partnered with Walgreens and electronic health record (EHR) companies such as Allscripts, Greenway, and NeoDeck to integrate analytics platforms into the point of care. Inovalon also examined the association of socioeconomic status and other factors with underlying poor quality performance of dual-eligible members in Medicare Advantage plans, releasing a study on October 28, 2014 that was presented to Congressional representatives on October 21, 2014.

In 2014, Inovalon expanded its partnership with Walgreens to implement its "ePASS" patient assessment tool and technology platform in clinics at Walgreens locations.

In May 2015, Inovalon released an analysis of dual eligible member data, which indicated that social and demographic factors affect health-related outcomes and measurements for health plan performance, independent of plan characteristics.

On September 1, 2015, Inovalon acquired Avalere Health, a strategic advisory company providing solutions to the pharmaceutical industry, managed care companies and provider organizations for $140 Million. The addition of Avalere, which serves 13 of the top 15 pharmaceutical companies has enabled Inovalon to expand its capabilities into an expansive adjacent market.

In September 2016, Inovalon announced the acquisition of Creehan Holding Co., Inc., the parent company of Creehan & Company, a provider of specialty pharmacy and specialty medications management software-as-a-service platforms. The acquisition closed on October 1, 2016.

In January 2017, Inovalon announced a partnership with Boehringer Ingelheim Pharmaceuticals Inc. on behalf of Boehringer Ingelheim’s diabetes alliance with Eli Lilly and Company, to support outcomes-based contracting and improve patient care.

On September 12, 2017, Inovalon announced UnitedHealthcare had entered into an agreement to implement the Inovalon ONE™ platform. Later that month, Inovalon announced a partnership with Daiichi Sankyo, Inc. to help develop outcomes-based contracts addressing opioid pain management.

In March 2018, Inovalon announced the acquisition of Minneapolis-based ABILITY Network, a cloud-based Software-as-a-Service (SaaS) healthcare technology company, for $1.2 billion. The acquisition closed on April 2, 2018.

In June 2018, Inovalon announced a five-year engagement with AllianceRx Walgreens Prime, the combined central specialty and home delivery pharmacy formed by Walgreens and pharmacy benefit manager Prime Therapeutics LLC (Prime), to bring technology advancements to the specialty pharmacy marketplace.

In June 2020, Inovalon announced a five-year engagement with Cardinal Health, Inc., to provide a configuration of Inovalon’s ScriptMed® Cloud. The platform will be used to support Cardinal Health's durable medical equipment and medical supplies business.

In July 2020, Inovalon announced an engagement with Walmart’s Specialty Pharmacy business to provide cloud-based capabilities through the Inovalon ONE® Platform to support improved outcomes and economics for its customers.
