= Stuart Gitlow =

American psychiatrist

- Born: New York City, New York, U.S.
- Education: University of Pittsburgh School of Public Health; Massachusetts Institute of Technology; University of Rhode Island; Mount Sinai School of Medicine
- Scientific career
- Workplaces: University of Florida, Dartmouth, Mount Sinai School of Medicine, Harvard Medical School

Stuart Gitlow (born November 29, 1962) is an American psychiatrist who is a past president of the American Society of Addiction Medicine.

== Biography ==
Gitlow was born on November 29, 1962. Following completion of his bachelor of science degree from the Massachusetts Institute of Technology, he earned an M.D. from Mount Sinai School of Medicine, a Master of Public Health degree from the University of Pittsburgh and Master of Business Administration degree from the University of Rhode Island. His psychiatric and public health training was completed at the University of Pittsburgh Medical Center and Harvard University for his forensic fellowship.

Gitlow was a medical expert to the Social Security Department's Office of Hearings Operations, President of the American Society of Addiction Medicine, American Society of Addiction Medicine delegate to the American Medical Association, and Chair of the American Medical Association Council on Science and Public Health.

According to the Centers for Medicare and Medicaid Services, Gitlow has received more than US $65,000 in funding since 2013. This includes more than US $16,000 in consulting payments from Janssen Pharmaceuticals, a subsidiary of Johnson & Johnson. He has also received more than $43,000 in fees for consulting with multiple pharmaceutical firms including Kaleo, Inc, Reckitt Benckiser, and Orexo.

== Politics ==
Gitlow has twice unsuccessfully sought election to the Rhode Island General Assembly as representative for Woonsocket, Rhode Island district 49.

On March 17, 2018, Gitlow's private residence and separate medical office were raided by the FBI as part of an ongoing investigation. No charges or allegations followed.
