= Dan Mendelson =

American businessman

Dan Mendelson is the CEO of Morgan Health, a business unit of JPMorgan Chase. Previously, he founded Avalere Health, a Washington, D.C.–based strategic advisory company, after serving in the Clinton White House. His opinions have been cited in The New York Times, The Wall Street Journal, National Public Radio, and Bloomberg, among other news outlets. He is the author of numerous papers and several editorials.

Mendelson is also an adjunct professor at the Georgetown University McDonough School of Business, and previously was an Executive in Residence at the Fuqua School of Business at Duke University.

== Early life and education ==
Mendelson was born in Fort Belvoir, Virginia, and grew up in Bethesda, Maryland. He earned a B.A. from Oberlin College and a Masters of Public Policy from Harvard University’s John F. Kennedy School of Government.

== Career ==
Mendelson began his career in health policy working for Professor William B. Schwartz at Tufts University, and co-authored a range of articles during that time. He next served as senior vice president of The Lewin Group and director of its Medical Technology Practice.

Before founding Avalere, Mendelson served as associate director for health at the White House Office of Management and Budget during the Clinton administration. In this position, he was responsible for preparing the president’s health budget in consultation with other White House offices, managing the appropriations process with members of Congress and their staffs and overseeing a range of management and budget issues in the U.S. Department of Health and Human Services, the United States Department of Veterans Affairs, and the Office of Personnel Management.

On leaving the White House in 2000, Mendelson founded The Health Strategies Consultancy, renamed Avalere Health in 2005. The company provides advisory services, research, and data products to a range of commercial and non-profit customers with interests in healthcare, providing oft-cited studies on Medicare, Medicaid, the 340B Drug Pricing Program, and the health insurance marketplace. Mendelson served as CEO of Avalere until 2015 when he sold the firm to Inovalon Holdings to focus the efforts of the group on deployment of platforms to improve quality. In 2021, Mendelson was named CEO of Morgan Health, a subsidiary of JPMorgan Chase, focusing on investments in innovation in employer-sponsored health care.

== Board memberships ==
Mendelson serves on the board of directors of Vera Whole Health and Champions Oncology. He previously served on the boards of Coventry Health Care, PharMerica, HMS Holdings, and Audacious Inquiry.
