= Champions Oncology =

American technology company

- Traded as: Nasdaq: CSBR; Russell Microcap Index component
- Founded: 2007
- Headquarters: Hackensack, New Jersey

Champions Oncology is an American technology company that develops mouse avatars. Called TumorGrafts, they are used to test a panel of chemotherapy regimens, targeted therapies and monoclonal antibodies to identify potential therapeutic options for cancer patients. The company was founded in 2007 by David Sidransky, M.D., a Johns Hopkins University oncologist.

== TumorGrafts ==
Champions TumorGrafts maintain the microenvironment surrounding the tumor and have been shown to have high correlation to the patient’s tumor. Due to this close resemblance to the human tumor, TumorGrafts are highly predictive of treatment outcomes in patients. Studies have shown the mouse avatars predict clinical benefit in 80% of patients. Approximately 450 TumorGrafts have been established as of April 2014.

TumorGrafts are also being used as a pre-clinical research tool to improve clinical drug development. Compared to traditional xenograft models, TumorGrafts, have a greater degree of accuracy in predicting clinical effectiveness of oncology drugs and thus can decrease clinical risk for drug developers. Champions has formed partnerships with multiple drug developers, including Teva and Pfizer.

=== The process ===
When a cancer patient undergoes surgery or biopsy, a living sample of the tumor is obtained and implanted into the mouse, creating a mouse avatar. Once the TumorGraft has successfully grown, the tumor is then propagated in a second generation of mice and tested against a panel of cancer drugs and drug combinations to help identify more accurately which treatment regimen is likely to be most effective in a specific patient. In this way, various drugs are tested on a live sample of the actual patient's tumor, rather than on the patient. This reduces the likelihood of treatment with ineffective drugs and their associated side effects, and it increases the likelihood of finding a treatment that will work against the patient's tumor. For patients whose tumors have also undergone molecular testing, such as next-generation sequencing, the selection of potential drugs is further guided by any and all applicable results. In the event the cancer progresses or recurs, Champions also banks, or stores, each successful TumorGraft for potential future patient use.
