= Medicine chest (idiom) =

Medicine chest or medicine cabinet is a colloquial phrase and idiom used to describe an area with the highest concentration of medicine stockpile, production, or potential of sources for medicines. The phrase is used with the area to specify the scope, such as world's medicine chest or nation's medicine cabinet.

== Rainforests ==
In nature, tropical rainforests are considered the world's medicine chest or world's largest pharmacy as 25% of Western pharmaceuticals are derived from ingredients found in tropical rainforests. Additionally, more than 2,000 plants from the tropical rainforests have been identified as having anti-cancer properties with 70% of those are found only in rainforests. There are additional potential to this medicine chest. Currently, only less than 1% of all species in rainforests have been analysed for their medicinal value.

== Pharmaceutical industry ==
=== Germany and Europe ===
In pharmaceutical industry, Germany was considered the world's medicine cabinet in late 20th century after German firms invented the pharmaceutical industry in the late 19th and early 20th centuries and recovered from the World War II. During the 1970s, the major pharmaceutical companies were concentrated in France, Germany, Switzerland and the United Kingdom with 55% of world's medicine production by major nation came from those countries. That gave the European pharmaceutical industry the world's medicine chest title until the 1990s. In 1990, the pharmaceutical companies in Europe outspent the upcoming American companies in research and development by 8 billion Euros to 5 billion Euros. However, in the period of 10 years, American companies had reversed the trend by investing more in research and development of medicines, which outspent European companies by 24 billion Euros to 17 billion Euros in 2000. As a result, some major companies started to relocate operation, research and other divisions including headquarters to the United States.

=== New Jersey ===
In the 1950s, New Jersey had been leading pharmaceutical industry in the United States, and it was given a nickname of Medicine Chest of the Nation at that time. As the industry expanded in the 21st century, New Jersey has become the state with more pharmaceutical companies than any other U.S. state, and known to be the world's medicine chest. In 2006, three of the top ten pharmaceutical companies in the world were headquartered in New Jersey.

In 2011, New Jersey was home to world or North American headquarters for 17 of the 20 largest pharmaceutical companies in the world. The state was ranked 6th in the nation in biotech, 3rd in bioscience venture capital investments and 4th in the number of bioscience patents. The growth of biotechnology companies in the state between 2008 and 2011 were increased more than 50% to have more than 300 biotech companies.

As of 2012, two of the top ten companies are based in New Jersey after Wyeth was acquired by New York-based firm, Pfizer in 2009.

== Stockpiling ==
In emergency management, when government entities stockpile essential medicines to be used in case of major emergencies, it can be said to be restocking the nation's emergency medicine chest. An example of such stockpiles is the Strategic National Stockpile in the United States.

== See also ==
- Breadbasket, a region with a high capacity for grain production
- Medicine chest
- Bathroom cabinet
- Rainforest
