= Aerie Pharmaceuticals =

Aeroe Pharmaceuticals Inc.
- Company type: Subsidiary
- Traded as: Nasdaq: AERI
- Industry: Pharmaceuticals; Ophthalmology
- Founded: 2005; 20 years ago
- Founders: David L. Epstein; Casey C. Kopczynski
- Defunct: August 2022
- Fate: Acquired
- Successor: Alcon
- Headquarters: Durham, North Carolina, United States
- Products: Medicines that control glaucoma or ocular hypertension
- Parent: Alcon
- Website: aeriepharma.com

Aerie Pharmaceuticals was an American clinical-stage pharmaceutical company focused on the discovery, development and commercialization of therapies for the treatment of patients with glaucoma and other diseases of the eye. Aerie's two lead product candidates were once-daily therapies for lowering intraocular pressure with mechanisms to treat patients with glaucoma or ocular hypertension.

In August 2022, Swiss eye-care firm Alcon agreed to buy Aerie Pharmaceuticals for US$770 million. The acquisition completed in November 2022.
