= Enzon Pharmaceuticals =

American pharmaceutical company

Enzon Pharmaceuticals, Inc.
- Company type: Public
- Traded as: OTCQX: ENZN; Nasdaq: ENZN
- Industry: Biotechnology
- Founded: 1981; 45 years ago
- Headquarters: Piscataway, New Jersey, Piscataway, New Jersey, United States
- Key people: George W. Hebard III, M.B.A. (CEO, Interim Principal Executive Officer, Interim Chief Operating Officer) Richard L. Feinstein CPA ( Principal Financial Officer, Principal Accounting Officer) (Dec 31, 2012))
- Products: Drugs
- Revenue: $ 34.49M (Dec31, 2013)
- Website: enzon.com

Enzon Pharmaceuticals, Inc. is a pharmaceutical company. Its headquarters is in Piscataway, New Jersey. The company is a publicly traded company on NASDAQ under the symbol "ENZN". It's also doing marketing works in Asia areas such as China. In 2012, the company orally presented in Nanjing, China about the symposium of its drug delivery systems, which help improve therapeutic molecules' pharmaceutical properties.

== History ==
Enzon Pharmaceuticals, Inc started its earliest business in 1981. Now, the focus of the company is mainly on development and production of drugs for cancer patients. It is also actively researching on improving the chemical attachment of PEG to help provide antibodies in molecules. In 2010, Enzon Pharmaceuticals, Inc.sold its specialty pharmaceutical business to the sigma-tau Group (sigma-tau).

== Production ==
The products of Enzon Pharmaceuticals, Inc include four principal compounds of different clinical development, as well as several novel mRNA antagonists in preclinical research.

== Research & Development ==
In July 2012, Enzon Pharmaceuticals presented the result from pre-clinical studies about human interferon-beta-1b (IFN-β-1b) and an anti-TNF-α antibody fragment (Fab) through releasable PEGylation at the 39th Annual Meeting & Exposition of the Controlled Release Society.
In June 2012, Enzon Pharmaceuticals presented the Phase I study of PEG-SN38 in children with recurrent or refractory neuroblastoma and other solid tumors at the 2012 Advances in Neuroblastoma Research Conference. In the same month, the company presented the Phase II study in which PEG-SN38 demonstrated notable activity in patients with previously treated metastatic breast at the American Society of Clinical Oncology Meeting.
In May 2012, Enzon Pharmaceuticals reached a strategic partnership using Enzon's PEGylation linker technology and PEG-SN38 (EZN-2208) in China.

== Corporate affairs ==
=== Stocks ===
The ticker symbol for Enzon Pharmaceuticals, Inc is "ENZN", which was traded on NASDAQ.

=== Scandals ===
The company has recently launched a nationwide recall of OMONTYS injection because of reports on serious hypersensitivity reactions, including possible life-threatening anaphylaxis.
