= Orexo =

Swedish pharmaceutical company

Orexo AB
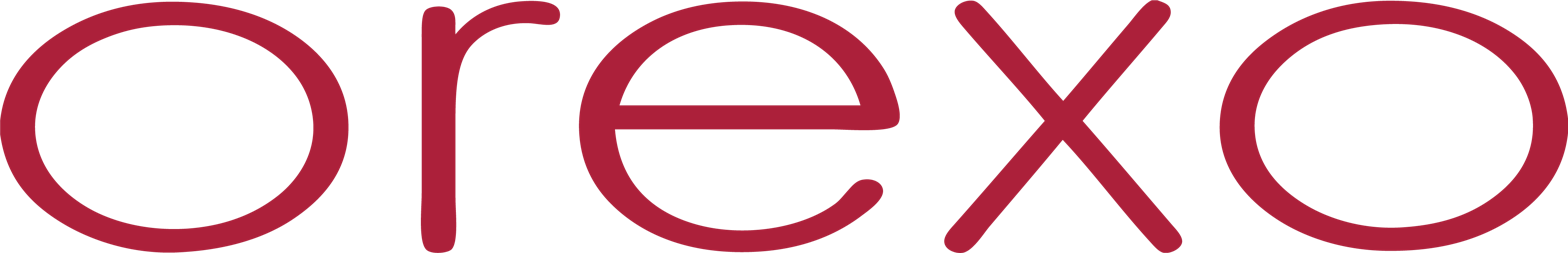
- Type: Public (Aktiebolag)
- Traded as: Nasdaq Stockholm: ORX; OTCQX: ORXOY
- ISIN: SE0000736415
- Industry: Pharmaceutical
- Founded: 1995
- Headquarters: Uppsala, Sweden,
- Area served: Worldwide
- Products: ZUBSOLV, Abstral, Edluar, MODIA, Vorvida and Deprexis
- Revenue: ▲SEK 624 million (2022)
- Net income: SEK -178 million million (2022)
- Number of employees: 126 (2022)
- Website: Orexo.com
- Footnotes; Employee and financial data as of 2022

Orexo is a Swedish pharmaceutical company that develops improved pharmaceuticals based on innovative formulation technologies that meet large medical needs. Through presence its in the US market, drugs and digital therapies are commercialized to treat opioid use disorder and adjacent diseases. Products targeting other therapeutic areas are developed and commercialized worldwide with partners.

== History ==
The company was founded in 1995 and their first product Diabact UBT, a breath test for diagnosing the causative agent of stomach ulcers (Helicobacter pylori), was introduced in 2000. In 2003, the company adopted the name Orexo and in 2005 the company was listed on the Stockholm Stock Exchange.

In 2008 the development of Abstral, a drug for the treatment of breakthrough cancer, was finalized. Abstral was the first product developed based on Orexo´s world-leading sublingual platform.

In 2010, through a right issue, Novo A/S became the largest shareholder in Orexo. With the investment from Novo A/S, the Board of Directors reviewed the strategy and created a vision of establishing a commercial business in the US.

In 2013, Orexo established a commercial subsidiary in the US and launched ZUBSOLV, a drug for the treatment of opioid use disorder.

In 2018, the company won a multiyear patent battle against the generic company Teva/Actavis securing patent protection for ZUBSOLV in the US until 2032.

With the intention to grow its business to include evidence-based therapeutics, Orexo started a collaboration with GAIA in 2019. GAIA is a world-leading digital therapeutics company based in Germany. Today Orexo commercializes three digital therapies on the US market, targeting patients within opioid use disorder and adjacent treatment areas.

In 2023, Orexo won another multiyear patent litigation, this time against Sun Pharma, securing ZUBSOLV’s patent protection in the US until 2032 and confirming the strength of the patents protecting the innovation and technology behind ZUBSOLV.

To meet the large need of efficient high-dose opioid overdose medications, such as OX124 and OX125, Orexo has developed the drug delivery technology AmorphOX it is powder-based and can be delivered intranasally or via inhalation. Orexo opted for powder-based technology for this product as powder-based products are more thermally stable and they have a longer shelf life.

== Products ==
- Abstral, for the treatment of breakthrough cancer pain. It was approved in Europe by the EMA in 2008 and in the United States by the FDA in 2011.
- Edluar, for the treatment of short-term insomnia. Approved by the FDA in 2009.
- ZUBSOLV, a sublingual tablet which combines the drugs buprenorphine and naloxone and treats opioid use disorder. FDA approved in July 2013. Launched in the United States in September 2013 As for Abstral and Edluar, ZUBSOLV is based on Orexo´s first generation drug delivery technology – the sublingual platform.
- Vorvida, is a 180-day digital therapy for alcohol management based on cognitive behavioral therapy (CBT) techniques.
- Deprexis, is a 90-day digital therapy for depression based on cognitive behavioral therapy (CBT) techniques.
- MODIA, is a 180-day digital therapy based on cognitive behavioral therapy (CBT) techniques and should be used as part of a supervised medication-assisted treatment (MAT) program for opioid use disorder.

== Products under development ==
AmorphOX is a clinically proven drug delivery platform that works with various APIs, dosage forms and administration routes.

Development projects based on the amorphOX platform:

- OX124, a high-dose medication for opioid overdose using naloxone.
- OX125, a rescue medication för opioid overdose using nalmefene.
- OX640, for emergency treatment of allergic reactions using epinephrine.

The company also develops OXMPI, a drug candidate for the treatment of endometriosis, together with its partner Gesynta Pharma which owns all rights to the candidate.
