= Columbia University Graduate School of Arts and Sciences =

Graduate school of Columbia University

Coordinates: 40.8079°N 73.9630°W

- Type: Private
- Established: 1880
- Dean: Carlos J. Alonso
- Students: ~3,500 students
- Location: New York, NY, U.S.
- Campus: Urban
- Website: gsas.columbia.edu

The Columbia University Graduate School of Arts and Sciences (also known as GSAS) is the graduate school of Columbia University. Founded in 1880, GSAS is responsible for most of Columbia's graduate degree programs in the humanities, social sciences, and natural sciences. The school offers MA and PhD degrees in approximately 78 disciplines.

== History ==
GSAS began to take shape in the late 19th century, when Columbia, until then a primarily undergraduate institution with a few professional attachments, began to establish graduate faculties in several fields: Political Science (1880), Philosophy (1890), and Pure Science (1892). The graduate faculties, notably, were open to women at a time when many other Columbia schools were not; Columbia College did not become a coeducational institution until 1983.

In addition, before 1880, the Master of Arts degree was awarded in the style of Cambridge and Oxford, that is three years after graduation and without further examination. This changed after June 1880, when the trustees implemented an examination for the award of the Master of Arts degree.

The Ph.D was first proposed as a degree in 1873 to be awarded under the auspices of the School of Mines. It was first awarded in 1877. The ability of granting the PhD later expanded to the Faculty of Political Science. The first woman to receive one did so in 1886.

The increasing professionalization of the university brought with it an emphasis on the graduate schools, as presidents such as Seth Low and Nicholas Murray Butler sought to emulate the success of German universities during the late 19th and early 20th centuries. Indeed, in the effort to produce as many graduate degree-holders as possible, attempts were made to streamline undergraduate life and center academic life in the graduate-focused departments. Graduate research has flourished at Columbia as a result, and the university has been among the top producers of PhDs in the United States from the inception of the graduate disciplines. In the early 1990s, GSAS and Columbia College faculty were all absorbed into a consolidated Faculty of Arts and Sciences, with familiar complaints among undergraduates and their advocates.

== List of academic departments ==
- African-American Studies
- African Studies Certificate
- American Studies (Liberal Studies M.A.)
- Anatomy and Cell Biology
- Anthropology (Ph.D in Anthropology & Education - joint degree with Teachers College)
- Applied Mathematics
- Applied Physics and Applied Mathematics
- Architecture (History and Theory)
- Art History and Archaeology
- Astronomy
- Atmospheric and Planetary Science
- Biochemistry and Molecular Biophysics
- Biological Sciences
- Biomedical Engineering
- Biomedical Informatics
- Biostatistics
- Biotechnology
- Buddhist Studies
- Business
- Cell Biology and Pathobiology
- Cellular, Molecular, and Biophysical Studies
- Chemical Biology
- Chemical Engineering
- Chemical Physics
- Chemistry
- Civil Engineering and Engineering Mechanics
- Classical Studies
- Classics
- Climate and Society (Former program that is now part of the Columbia Climate School)
- Communications
- Comparative Literature and Society
- Computer Science
- Conservation Biology
- Dental Sciences
- Earth and Environmental Engineering (Henry Krumb School of Mines)
- Earth and Environmental Science Journalism
- Earth and Environmental Sciences
- East Asia: Regional Studies
- East Asian Languages and Cultures
- East Asian Studies (Liberal Studies M.A.)
- Ecology, Evolution, and Environmental Biology
- Economics
- Education (Teachers College)
- Electrical Engineering
- English and Comparative Literature
- Environmental Health Sciences
- Epidemiology
- French and Romance Philology
- French Cultural Studies in a Global Context
- Genetics and Development
- Germanic Languages
- Global Thought
- History
- Human Rights
- Human Rights Studies
- Industrial Engineering & Operations Research
- International and World History, Dual Degree M.A./M.Sc.
- Islamic Studies (Liberal Studies M.A.)
- Italian Studies
- J.D./Ph.D. Program
- Japanese Pedagogy
- Jewish Studies
- Jewish Studies (Liberal Studies M.A.)
- Journalism
- Latin America and Caribbean; Regional Studies
- Linguistics
- M.D./Ph.D.
- Materials Science and Engineering/Solid State Science and Engineering
- Mathematical Structures for Environmental & Social Sciences
- Mathematics
- Mathematics of Finance
- Mechanical Engineering
- Medieval and Renaissance Studies
- Medieval Studies (Liberal Studies M.A.)
- Microbiology
- Middle Eastern, South Asian, and African Studies
- Middle East Studies, Certificate
- Modern Art, Critical, and Curatorial Studies
- Modern European Studies (Liberal Studies M.A.)
- Museum Anthropology
- Music
- Neurobiology and Behavior
- Nutrition
- Operations Research
- Oral History
- Pathology and Cell Biology
- Pharmacology
- Philosophical Foundations of Physics
- Philosophy
- Physics
- Physiology and Cellular Biophysics
- Political Science
- Psychology
- Quantitative Methods in the Social Sciences
- Quantitative Methods in the Social Sciences, dual degree MA/MPA
- Religion
- Religion-Journalism Dual MA/MS
- Russia, Eurasia and East Europe: Regional Studies M.A. Program
- Russian Translation
- Slavic Cultures
- Slavic Languages
- Social Work
- Sociology
- Sociomedical Sciences
- South Asian Studies (Liberal Studies M.A.)
- Spanish and Portuguese
- Statistics
- Sustainable Development
- Theatre and Performance
- Urban Planning
- Yiddish Studies

== Notable alumni ==

=== Economists ===
- Kenneth Arrow – Ph.D., 1951
- Arthur Burns – Ph.D., 1934
- Milton Friedman – Ph.D., 1946
- Christina Paxson – PhD 1987 - 19th President, Brown University

=== Historians ===
- Nina Ansary – Ph.D 2013
- Jacques Barzun – Ph.D. 1932
- Charles A. Beard – Ph.D. 1904
- Dominique Collon - Ph.D 1971
- Lawrence Cremin – M.A. 1947, Ph.D. 1949
- Richard Hofstadter – Ph.D. 1942
- Bruce Cumings – Ph.D. 1975
- Stanley Payne — Ph.D. 1959
- Howard Zinn — Ph.D. 1958

=== Literature ===
- Jacob M. Appel – writer and bioethicist, M.A., 2000
- John Ashbery – poet, 1951
- Isaac Asimov – science fiction writer, M.A. 1941
- Paul Auster – writer, M.A., 1970
- Randolph Bourne – antiwar essayist, M.A. 1913
- Rachel Blau DuPlessis – literary critic, M.A. 1964, Ph.D. 1970
- Joseph Campbell – literary scholar and philosopher, M.A., 1927
- Teju Cole - novelist and critic, M.Phil. art history, 2003
- John Eisenhower - military historian and son of Dwight D. Eisenhower, M.A., 1950
- Jason Epstein – writer, M.A., 1950
- John Erskine – literary scholar, Ph.D. 1903
- James Goldman – writer, 1952
- William Goldman – screenwriter, 1956
- Naomi Foner Gyllenhaal – screenwriter
- David G. Hartwell - critic and editor, Ph.D. 1973
- Carolyn Heilbrun – writer, M.A. 1951, Ph.D. 1959
- Joseph Heller – writer, 1949
- Zora Neale Hurston – writer, 1935
- Alfred Kazin – literary critic, 1958
- Kenneth Koch – poet, M.A. 1953, Ph.D. 1959
- Joseph Wood Krutch – writer, M.A. 1916, Ph.D. 1929
- David Lehman – poet, Ph.D. 1978
- Peter Straub – writer, 1966
- Lionel Trilling – literary critic, M.A. 1926, Ph.D. 1938
- Anne Tyler – novelist, 1962
- Mark Van Doren – writer, Ph.D. 1920
- Stark Young – critic and writer, 1902

=== Philosophers ===
- Mortimer Adler – Ph.D. in psychology, 1928
- Arthur Danto – M.A. 1949, Ph.D. in philosophy, 1952
- Irwin Edman – Ph.D. in philosophy, 1919
- Hu Shih – public intellectual in China, Ph.D. 1917

=== Natural scientists ===
- Jacqueline Barton – chemist, 1979
- Niles Eldredge – paleontologist, Ph.D. 1969
- Stephen Jay Gould – paleontologist, Ph.D. 1967
- John Diederich Haseman - zoologist, geologist and explorer, Ph.D. 1911
- Neil deGrasse Tyson – astrophysicist, author, science communicator, Ph.D. 1991

=== Performing arts ===
- Kenneth Ascher, DMA – jazz pianist, composer – 1966 CC; 1968 GSAS; 1971 SOA
- Alan Heyman, traditional Korean musicologist and composer, 1959
- Art Garfunkel – musician, 1967
- Will Geer – actor
- Edward Everett Horton – actor, 1909
- John Kander – composer, 1954
- Bernard Malamud – writer, 1942
- Thomas Merton – Catholic writer, 1939

=== Social scientists ===
- Ruth Benedict – anthropologist, Ph.D. 1923
- Theos Casimir Bernard – explorer and religionist, M.A. 1936, Ph.D. 1943
- Kenneth B. Clark – educational psychologist, Ph.D. 1940
- Mamie Phipps Clark – educational psychologist, Ph.D. 1943
- Gilberto Freyre — Brazilian sociologist, cultural anthropologist and historian, M.A. 1922
- Robert A. Leonard — linguist, M.A. and M. Phil. 1973, Ph.D 1982
- Margaret Mead — anthropologist, Ph.D. 1929
- Lorine Livingston Pruette — psychologist, Ph.D. 1924

=== Politicians ===
- B. R. Ambedkar – a founding father of India, M.A. 1915, Ph.D. 1928
- Nicholas Murray Butler – diplomat and President of Columbia University, Ph.D. 1884
- Benjamin Cardozo – jurist, M.A. 1890
- Wellington Koo – Chinese diplomat, Ph.D. 1912
- Robert Moses urban planner, Ph.D. 1914
- Frances Perkins – US Secretary of Labor, M.A. 1910
- Brent Scowcroft – US National Security Advisor, M.A. and Ph.D. in international relations, 1967
- Mark Wyland – California State Senator, M.A. in political science, 1969
- Madeleine Albright - Secretary of State, Ph.D. in public law and governance, 1976

=== Visual arts ===
- Mary Godfrey – art educator
- Donald Clarence Judd – sculptor, 1961
- Agnes Martin – painter, M.A. 1952
- Jerome J. Pollitt – art historian, Ph.D. 1963
- Meyer Schapiro – art historian, Ph.D. 1929

=== Other fields ===
- Peter Buck – co-founder of Subway restaurant chain, Ph.D.
- Wm. Theodore de Bary – American Sinologist and scholar of East Asian philosophy, Ph.D. 1953
- Herman Hollerith – inventor, Ph.D. 1890
- Pankaj Jain - Professor of Philosophy, Religious Studies, Film Studies, and Sustainability
- Jose Franklin Jurado-Rodriguez – Moneylaunderer for the Cali Cartel kingpin Jose Santacruz Londono
- Sam Levenson – comedian, 1938
- Ge Li – Chinese American billionaire, co-founder of WuXi AppTec, Ph.D. 1994
- John McCaffery – newscaster
- Richard P. Mills – former Commissioner of Education for both Vermont and New York States, M.A. 1967
- Madeleine B. Stern – rare book expert, M.A. 1934
- Judith Rodin – 7th president of the University of Pennsylvania and president of the Rockefeller Foundation, Ph.D. 1970
- Sol M. Stroock – lawyer, M.A. 1892
- Leonard Tow – Chairman and CEO of Citizens Communications, Ph.D. 1960
- James T. Lee - lawyer, banker, real estate developer, and grandfather of Jacqueline Kennedy Onassis and Lee Radziwill, A.M. 1902
- Peter Hildebrand Meienberg – Swiss Benedictine missionary based in East Africa
