= CCMP Capital =

American private equity investment firm

Coordinates: 40.7552°N 73.9741°W

CCMP Capital Advisors, LP
- Type: Private
- Industry: Private Equity
- Founded: 1984 (2006 Spinout from JPMorgan Chase)
- Headquarters: 277 Park Avenue; New York City, New York, United States
- Key people: Greg Brenneman (executive chairman); Timothy Walsh (president and CEO)
- Products: Leveraged buyout, Growth capital, Private equity funds
- AUM: $4.7 billion
- Website: www.ccmpcapital.com

CCMP Capital Advisors, LP is an American private equity investment firm that focuses on leveraged buyout and growth capital transactions. Formerly known as JP Morgan Partners, the investment professionals of JP Morgan Partners separated from JPMorgan Chase on July 31, 2006. CCMP has invested approximately $12 billion in leveraged buyout and growth capital transactions since inception. In 2007, CCMP was ranked #17 among the world's largest private equity funds.

CCMP has 37 employees with offices in New York, London, Hong Kong and Tokyo. In 2008, CCMP hired Greg Brenneman as chairman.

== History ==
CCMP has been known by several names over the past two decades, founded as Chemical Venture Partners in 1984, to serve as the private equity and venture capital arm of Chemical Bank.

Following Chemical's acquisition of Chase Manhattan Bank in 1996, Chemical adopted the Chase name and Chemical Venture Partners changed its name to Chase Capital Partners. Similarly, following the 2000 acquisition of J.P. Morgan & Co. and the formation of JPMorgan Chase, the group changed its name yet again to JP Morgan Partners. Over this time, the platform grew through its integration of the private equity organizations of Manufacturers Hanover, Chase Manhattan, Hambrecht & Quist, Robert Fleming & Co., The Beacon Group and J.P. Morgan & Co.

Chase Capital Partners Logo (1996-2000)

JPMorgan Partners Logo (2000-2006)

In 2004, JPMorgan Chase completed its acquisition of Bank One which had its own in house private equity investment group, One Equity Partners. One Equity, led by Dick Cashin was ultimately designated as the lead private equity platform for JPMorgan Chase at which point JP Morgan Partners formalized plans to spin out of JPMorgan Chase.

JP Morgan Partners announced the spinout in March 2005 and completed the separation from JPMorgan Chase effective July 31, 2006. The new firm adopted the CCMP acronym in reference to its predecessor entities (i.e., Chemical and Chase and JP Morgan Partners). In April 2006, JPMorgan Chase completed the sale of a $925 million interest in JP Morgan Partners Global Fund to a consortium of secondary investors.

The spinout of CCMP came at the same time as the spinouts of private equity groups from other leading investment banks including: Morgan Stanley (Metalmark Capital), Citigroup (Court Square Capital Partners), Deutsche Bank (MidOcean Partners) and Credit Suisse First Boston (Avista Capital Partners, Diamond Castle Holdings).

In 2007, CCMP completed fundraising for its most recent fund, closing on $3.4 billion in commitments from institutional investors for CCMP Capital Investors II. CCMP Capital Investors II, represented the first fund raised by the CCMP team subsequent to its split from JPMorgan Chase and came in slightly below the original $3.5 billion target that CCMP set for the fundraising.

In February 2014, CCMP sold the pharmaceutical contract research organization Medpace to Cinven for around $900 million.

In August 2016, CCMP Capital Advisors acquired Badger Sportswear, a Statesville, N.C.-based maker of team uniforms, performance athletic wear and fanwear.

=== Panorama Capital ===
Prior to its spin out from JPMorgan Chase in 2006, JP Morgan Partners made investments in leveraged buyout, growth capital and venture capital transactions. Following the spinout, the investment professionals focused on venture capital transactions separated from the CCMP Capital team to form a new firm, Panorama Capital.

Based in Menlo Park, California, Panorama continues to focus on early and expansion-stage opportunities in both the information technology and life sciences sectors. Panorama began raising its first independent fund in October 2005, with a target size of $500 million. After more than a year of fundraising, Panorama closed on approximately $240 million of investor commitments.

=== Unitas Capital ===
In December 2008, CCMP Capital Asia, which had operated increasingly autonomously of the US and European teams, completed a formal separation from CCMP Capital, changing its name to Unitas Capital. CCMP Capital Asia, which operated separate private equity investment funds had co-invested in several transactions alongside the global funds.

=== Linzor Capital ===
Among the other notable spinouts from CCMP's predecessor, JPMorgan Partners was Linzor Capital Partners. Linzor, which focuses on private equity investments in Latin America, was founded in 2006 by Tim Purcell, Alfredo Irigoin and Carlos Ingham. In 2000, Tim Purcell and Alfredo Irigoin had founded J.P. Morgan Partners Latin America a leading investor in private equity transactions in Latin America. Prior to the merger of J.P. Morgan and Chase in 2000, Purcell had been responsible for J.P. Morgan Capital’s Latin American private equity portfolio from the mid-1990s.

In Sep. 2013, CCMP bought PureGym, then in 2015 it bought LA Fitness, a PureGym rival. In Nov. 2017, CCMP Capital sold PureGym to Leonard Green & Partners.

In Dec. 2018, CCMP Capital declined to comment when its portfolio company Badger had its products pulled from US colleges after its clothing was traced to Chinese detention camps. At the time, CCMP had four sportswear companies including Badger under the umbrella of Founder Sport Group. The AP had tracked Badger Sportswear shipments to one such Xinjiang internment camp with Muslim captives.

== Investments ==
CCMP manages both the JP Morgan Partners Global Fund and CCMP Capital Investors II. Among CCMP's investments are the following portfolio companies:

- 1-800-Flowers
- AMC Entertainment
- Aramark
- Berry Plastics
- Bill Barrett Corporation
- Brake Bros Ltd
- Cabela's.
- Crosstown Traders
- DIC Entertainment
- Generac Power Systems, Inc.
- Guitar Center, Inc
- Hanley Wood
- Hillman Solutions (relisted on NASDAQ in 2021)
- Infogroup
- Klöckner Pentaplast
- Kraton (polymer)
- Medpace
- ONO (Spain)
- Pinnacle Foods
- PureGym
- Quiznos Sub
- Renovo
- Smurfit Kappa
- The Tennis Channel
- Triad Hospitals
- Truck Hero, Inc.
- Vetco
- Volotea
- Warner Chilcott

== See also ==
- Private equity
- Leveraged buyout
- Growth capital
- JPMorgan Chase
- Chemical Bank
- Chase Manhattan Bank
- Bank One
