= Wuxi (disambiguation) =

Wuxi (Chinese: 无锡; pinyin: Wúxī) is a prefecture-level city in Jiangsu.

Wuxi may also refer to:

- Wuxi County (Chinese: 巫溪; pinyin: Wūxī), a county in Chongqing Municipality
- Wuxi, Luxi (武溪镇), a town of Luxi County, Hunan
- Wu Xi (footballer), Chinese footballer who currently plays in the Chinese Super League
- Wu Xi (diplomat), ambassador of China to New Zealand
- WuXi AppTec
- WuXi Biologics
