= Vetco =

British oilfield service company

VetcoGray
- Type: Private limited company by shares
- Industry: Oil and Gas Equipment, Services
- Founded: 2004
- Defunct: 2007
- Fate: Acquired by GE Oil & Gas
- Headquarters: London, UK
- Key people: Peter Goode (Group CEO & Vetco Gray CEO); R. Rasmus Sunde (Vetco Aibel CEO); Bobby Smith (Executive Chairman)
- Products: Facility Management; Maintenance & Modifications; Process Systems & Products; Subsea Drilling Systems; Subsea Production Systems; Surface Capital Systems; Surface Wellhead Systems; Upstream Production Facilities
- Number of employees: 11,000 (2006)
- Parent: GE Infrastructure Oil & Gas

Vetco was a British oilfield service company that was established in July 2004 and operated through its subsidiaries Vetco Gray and Vetco Aibel AS. Vetco was the result of a consortium consisting of the private equity firms Candover, 3i and JP Morgan Partners, which took over ABB's oil and gas division, ABB Offshore Systems. The predecessor companies served the upstream oil and gas industry from 1903, supplying products, systems, and services for onshore and offshore drilling. Vetco was headquartered in London, UK, and employed over 10,000 people in more than 30 countries worldwide.

== Operations ==
=== Aibel ===
Aibel is a provider of engineering, procurement and construction services—as well as project management, maintenance, and modifications—to the upstream oil and gas industry. Aibel employs more than 7,000 people in 17 countries. Vetco Aibel is, along with Aker Kværner, one of the largest companies operating in the North Sea.

=== VetcoGray ===
On July 30, 2008, in Egypt's Gulf of Suez, the company converted an exploration well to full production, converting a mudline exploration system to an SG-1 wellhead subsea system for production duty. The newly converted well entered service in April of that year.

The Agiba Petroleum Company, a joint venture company between the Egyptian General Petroleum Corporation (EGPC) and Eni based in Cairo, produces approximately 50,000 barrels of oil per day. Eni, an Italian multi-national oil and gas company, has operated in Egypt since 1959.

== History ==
=== VetcoGray ===
VetcoGray is a combination of a number of companies including Regan Offshore, Ventura Tool Company, and Gray Tool Company.

The Ventura Tool Company was formed in 1930 by Carl and Fritz Huntsinger. Fritz Huntsinger purchased the existing Schwab-Lane Tool Company on Ventura Avenue in Ventura, California and changed its name to the Ventura Tool Company. The company repaired pumps and other machinery in oilfields. It grew slowly through the Great Depression, but by 1937 had 50 employees. Ventura Tool improved upon the existing borescope, an instrument used for inspecting cannon barrels. Huntsinger had a light added to the tip so that the instrument, which used a wide angle lens to relay images back to its operator, could be used for locating defects in petroleum pipes. This innovation revolutionized the inspection of petroleum pipes for defects. Ventura Tool gradually added new techniques for use in these inspections, and the company grew further. It acquired the Master Thread Company, Pressure Weld, Inc., and Tube Upset Corporation. The company specialized in pipe repair and began to develop a high-speed drill in the 1940s. It also began manufacturing tools for the Air Force. The company would eventually change its emphasis and reincorporate as Vetco Offshore Industries, Inc. in the late 1950s.

Vetco was sold in the 1980s to Houston-based Combustion Engineering (C-E) and moved away from its original base in the Ventura Oil Field. VetcoGray was then acquired by Hughes Tool in 1986 for $270mm. The acquisition occurred just as oil prices were collapsing and Baker Hughes, the successor to Hughes Tool, disposed of 70.1% of VetcoGray to Bain Capital funds for $3.8mm. Bain Capital sold VetcoGray to ABB in 1991. Between 1991 and 2001, VetcoGray completed acquisitions in Canada, Mexico, Argentina, Venezuela, and the UK. In 2004, the ABB VetcoGray oil and gas business was acquired by a consortium consisting of the private equity firms Candover, 3i, and JP Morgan Partners. In February 2007, GE Oil & Gas acquired the company. David Tucker was appointed as chief operating officer for VetcoGray.

=== Vetco Aibel ===
Vetco Aibel traces its roots to Elektrisk Bureau (EB) and Norsk Elektrisk & Brown Boveri (NEBB). These companies are became the Norwegian part of ABB.

A separate offshore business, EB Offshore, was founded in 1989. Vetco Aibel evolved through acquisitions of Seatec, Maritime Seanor and Umoe Oil and Gas, as well as organic growth.

== Track record ==
FPSOs

- Berge Helene
- Petrojarl I
- Norne
- Åsgard A
- Sendje Berge
- Berge Hus
- Chinguetti
- Alvheim
- Vittorio (Golfinho II)
- Ettrick
- Vincent (Ngujima-Yin)

=== Vetco Aibel ===
==== Topsides ====
- Alvheim FPSO/Marathon – EPC Topsides
- Volve/Mærsk-Statoil – EPC Topsides
- Kvitebjørn/Statoil - EPC Topsides
- Ringhorne/Esso – EPCI Platform
- Troll C/Hydro – EPC Semi
- Visund/Hydro - EPC Semi
- Heimdal 2000/Hydro– EPC Platform
- Jotun B/Esso – EPCI Platform
- Valhall WP/BP – EPCI Platform

==== Products ====
- Norsk Hydro, Troll C field. Start-up July 2003. Solved emulsion problems and increased production.
- Bluewater Munin, Xijiang field. Start-up October 2004. Oil production capacity increase.
- Norsk Hydro, Grane field. Start-up June 2005, improved separation of heavy oil.
- Maersk Oil Qatar, Al Shaheen field. Start-up 2005, solving emulsion problems.
- Petrobras-FPSO Jubarte P-34, Test Separator. Delivered 2005, heavy oil.

== See also ==
- List of oilfield service companies
