= Abgent =

Global biotechnology company based in San Diego, California

Abgent, a WuXi AppTec company
- Company type: Public
- Industry: Biotech, life Sciences, manufacturing
- Founded: San Diego, California, United States (2001)
- Headquarters: US
- Area served: Worldwide
- Products: Antibodies, peptides, custom antibody services, custom peptide services, custom protein services
- Number of employees: 200 (2014)
- Parent: WuXi AppTec
- Website: abgent.com

Abgent is a global biotechnology company based in San Diego, California, US, with offices in Maidenhead, UK, and Suzhou, China, and distributors around the world. Abgent develops antibodies and related agents to study proteins involved in cellular function and disease. Abgent's antibodies target key areas of research including autophagy, neuroscience, cancer, stem cells and more. Abgent was acquired in 2011 by WuXi AppTec, a global pharmaceutical, biopharmaceutical, and medical device outsourcing company with operations in China and the United States.

== Peer review ==
Abgent was listed as a selected supplier in Nature Magazine, Antibody Technology, Drug Discovery Features and The Scientist's cell signaling feature. More than 1,100 peer-reviewed publications in scientific journals have cited Abgent antibody, protein, and peptide products and custom services.

== Core business ==
As one of the world's largest manufacturers of antibodies for biological research and drug discovery, Abgent develops, produces, and sells antibodies for use in academic, biotechnological, and pharmaceutical industries. Core products are complemented by custom antibody services and custom protein services for drug discovery targets.

== Tools ==
=== SUMOplot Analysis Program ===
SUMOplot is a tool used to predict sumoylation sites, an important post-translational modification of proteins. SUMO-modified proteins contain the tetrapeptide motif B-K-x-D/E where B is a hydrophobic residue, K is the lysine conjugated to SUMO, x is any amino acid (aa), D or E is an acidic residue. Substrate specificity appears to be derived directly from Ubc9 and the respective substrate motif. SUMOplot predicts the probability for the SUMO consensus sequence (SUMO-CS) to be engaged in SUMO attachment. The SUMOplot score system is based on two criteria: first, direct amino acid match to the SUMO-CS observed and shown to bind Ubc9, and second, substitution of the consensus amino acid residues with amino acid residues exhibiting similar hydrophobicity. SUMOplot has been used in the past to predict Ubc9 dependent sites.

=== Autophagy Receptor Motif Plotter ===
The autophagy pathway is mediated by selective receptors. They recognize and sort diverse cargo substrates (e.g., proteins, organelles, pathogens) for delivery to the autophagic machinery. Known autophagy receptors are characterized by short linear sequence motifs (autophagy receptor motifs, or ARMs) responsible for the interaction with the Atg8/LC3 family. Many ARM-containing proteins (ARM-CPs) are also involved in autophagosome formation and maturation and a few of them in regulating signaling pathways. Autophagy Receptor Motif Plotter assists in the identification of novel ARM-CPs. Users input a given an amino acid sequence into the web-enabled tool, and the program identifies internal sequences matching a pattern within the 3 classes of the extended ARM motif (x6-W/F/Yxxx-x2). The program then computes and lists the top four scores for each motif class (W-, F-, Y-). The full sequence of the ARM-CP is displayed, where ARMs are colored by their score and ranked score-values are presented in tabular form.

== See also ==
- Antibodies
- Autophagy database
- Neurodegenerative disorders
- Stem cell marker
- SUMO protein
