= Alimentiv =

Contract research organization

Alimentiv, Inc.
- Type: Public
- Industry: Clinical Research
- Predecessor: Robarts Research Institute
- Founded: 1986; 40 years ago in London, Ontario, Canada
- Headquarters: London, Ontario, Canada
- Area served: Worldwide
- Key people: Pierre Gaudreault (CEO)
- Website: alimentiv.com

Alimentiv Inc. is a contract research organization (CRO) specializing in GI clinical trials, medical imaging, precision medicine, statistics services, and clinical consulting for pharmaceutical and biotechnology companies.

Headquartered in London, Ontario, Alimentiv employs more than 700 people across its operations in Canada, the United States, Europe, Asia-Pacific, and Latin America.

== History ==
Alimentiv operated as Robarts Clinical Trials, part of Western University starting in 1986. In 2020 the company was purchased from Western University and began operations as Alimentiv Inc., the rebranding supposedly reflected the company’s continued growth as a specialized contract research organization.

Today, Alimentiv provides services in more than 64 countries worldwide, collaborates with leading scientists and organizations around the globe such as Summit Clinical Research, LLC, and works with pharmaceutical and biotechnology organizations to bring new and improved GI treatment options to patients.

In 2021, Alimentiv acquired McDougall Scientific Ltd., a niche CRO specializing in statistical analysis, data management, reporting, and clinical trial design. This was followed by Alimentiv launching AcelaBio in 2021, a commercial research laboratory, located in San Diego, CA delivering histopathology and precision medicine services for global clinical trials.
