= GE Oil and Gas =

Division of General Electric

GE Oil & Gas
- Type: Subsidiary
- Industry: Oil and gas
- Predecessor: GE Energy
- Founded: 2016; 10 years ago
- Headquarters: London, United Kingdom
- Key people: Lorenzo Simonelli (CEO)
- Revenue: US$16.5 billion (2015)
- Number of employees: 39,000 (2015)
- Parent: Baker Hughes
- Website: www.bhge.com

GE Oil & Gas was the division of General Electric that owned its investments in the petroleum industry. In July 2017, this division was merged with Baker Hughes.

The division supplied equipment for the petroleum industry, including drilling, subsea and offshore, onshore, LNG, distributed gas, oil pipeline and oil storage, oil refinery and petrochemicals. GE Oil & Gas also designed and manufactured surface and subsea drilling and production systems, equipment for floating production platforms, gas compressors, gas turbines, turboexpanders, high pressure reactors, industrial electricity generation. GE Oil & Gas also provided pipeline integrity solutions, sensor-based measurement, inspection, and condition monitoring, controls and radiation measurement solutions.

In 2016, GE Oil & Gas employed approximately 37,000 people, serving customers in over 140 countries.

The division was part of the GE Power (formerly GE Energy) division of General Electric.

== History ==
=== Formation ===
GE entered the petroleum industry in 1994 with the acquisition of Italian company Nuovo Pignone (previously owned by ENI S.p.A.).

=== Acquisitions and divestments ===
==== 2000-2010 ====
In 2002, the division acquired Bently Nevada, a condition monitoring instrumentation company that provides services for sensors, systems and monitoring machinery vibration. Products included plant asset management systems related to vibration monitoring, machinery protection, software and engineering services. Bently Nevada was added to the GE Measurement & Control division.

In 2007, GE acquired Vetco's Vetco Gray for $1.9 billion. VetcoGray operated in around 30 countries and was one of the world's leading suppliers of drilling, completion and production equipment for on- and offshore oil and gas fields, including subsea applications.

In October 2007, GE acquired Sondex Plc, a UK-based oilfield services technology company that specialized in the engineering and manufacturing of directional drilling and formation evaluation systems and wireline tools for the production of oil and gas, for £290 million.

In April 2008, GE acquired Hydril Pressure Control, a supplier of pressure control equipment used in the oil and gas drilling industry, with focus on deep and ultra-deepwater applications. Its product lines included blowout preventer systems, parts, repair, and field services.

==== 2011 ====
In March 2011, GE acquired Wellstream, a British company which designed and manufactures flexible risers and flowline products for oil and gas transportation in the subsea production industry, for approximately £800 million.

In April 2011, GE acquired John Wood Group’s Well Support Division, which allowed it to expand into drilling and surface manufacturing and services, for $2.8 billion. Its products included electric submersible pumps (ESP), wellheads, trees and logging services.

In 2011, GE also acquired Dresser Inc., which delivers compression, flow technology, measurement and distribution infrastructure and services. Its portfolio includes valves, actuators, meters, switches, regulators, piping products and natural gas-fueled engines for compression.

==== 2012 ====
In 2012, GE acquired PRESENS, a Norwegian company which develops and supplies pressure, temperature and flow measurement sensor solutions. These products sit within the company's Digital Solutions business.

Also in 2012, GE acquired Naxys, a provider of subsea leak detection and condition monitoring sensors based on passive acoustic technology. These products allow operators to monitor the integrity of their subsea installations, and form part of the company's Digital Solutions business.

==== 2013 ====
In 2013 GE Oil & Gas completed a $3.3 billion acquisition of Lufkin Industries Inc., a manufacturing company that produces artificial lift technologies that help bring oil and gas to the surface, such as oilfield pumping units and power transmission gear boxes.

In 2013 GE Oil & Gas also acquired Salof Companies, who design and manufacture small-scale liquefied natural gas (LNG) technologies.

Also in 2013, GE Oil & Gas acquired Allen Gearing Solutions, a privately held designer, manufacturer and service provider of gears for industrial and marine applications. The company produces high-power gearing solutions, specializing in epicyclic gears that typically have a higher power density than parallel shaft gear systems.

==== 2014 ====
In June 2014, GE acquired the Reciprocating Compression Division of Cameron International for $550 million. The division provided reciprocating compression equipment and aftermarket parts and services for oil and gas production, gas processing, gas distribution and independent power industries.

==== 2015 ====
In 2015, GE acquired Advantec, a provider of subsea intervention equipment and services, as part of the company's strategy to expand its position as a provider of subsea production equipment and services solutions.

==== 2016/2017 ====
At the end of October 2016, it was announced that General Electric was under negotiations for a deal valued at about $30 billion to combine GE Oil & Gas with Baker Hughes. The transaction would create a publicly traded entity controlled by GE. It was announced that GE Oil & Gas would sell off its water treatment business as part of its divestment agreement with Baker Hughes. The deal was cleared by the EU in May 2017, and by the DOJ in June 2017. The merger agreement was approved by shareholders at the end of June 2017. On July 3, 2017, the transaction was completed and Baker Hughes became a GE company.

2019

In 2019, GE announced plans to reduce its ownership in Baker Hughes from 50.4% to 38.4%, losing majority control. In September 2019, GE sold a large enough stake in Baker Hughes to lose its status as majority shareholder.

== Partnerships ==
The Digital Solutions business has also announced a partnership with BP to develop and pilot a new digital solution for Asset Performance Management in BP's offshore operations.

The business has also partnered with Paradigm, an independent software developer for the oil and gas industry, to deliver reservoir driven production optimization (RDPO) to optimize field level production.

== Technology Solutions Centers (TSC) ==
GE Oil & Gas is one of the GE businesses featured in GE's network of fifteen Technology Solutions Centers (TSC), which are located in key technology hubs around the world. The purpose of these centers is to foster collaboration and allow customers to better understand how GE products and services fit into their projects. They feature a combination of interactive video content, scale models and live demonstrations.

== Global Research Center ==
In 2013, GE announced they had selected a site in Downtown Oklahoma City for a Global Research Center dedicated to oil and gas technology. The center will focus on accelerating mid to later stage oil and gas technologies developed in GE's Global Research labs, including production systems, well construction, water use optimization, CO_{2} solutions and energy systems. The Center opened in October 2016.

== Notable projects and collaborations ==
=== Ichthys LNG Project ===
In January 2012, GE Oil & Gas announced they had won contracts worth more than US$1 billion to supply equipment and services for the Ichthys LNG project in Australia. GE will provide rotating equipment, including gas turbines and compressors, and associated floating production storage and offloading and a central processing facility. GE will also supply subsea production systems for the offshore portion of the project as well as subsea connectors for a 552-mile pipeline.

=== GLS Holding S.A. ===
In January 2013 GE Oil & Gas and the Angolan group GLS Holding S.A. announced the formation of a new joint venture, GE-GLS Oil & Gas Angola Limited, to better support Angola's growing oil and gas sector. This agreement includes an initial investment of US$175 million to build a new manufacturing facility in Soyo that will supply subsea equipment to the oil and gas industry in Angola.

=== Statoil ===
In January 2015, GE Oil & Gas and Statoil announced a strategic collaboration to advance more environmentally friendly and economically sustainable technologies for oil and gas production. The collaboration is focused on technological innovations that will allow the oil and gas industry to reduce emissions and local community impacts while improving productivity.

This collaboration has included two Open Innovation Challenges that invited businesses, institutions and individuals to develop potential solutions to make energy production more sustainable. The first Open Innovation Challenge was issued in January 2015 and required entrants to find ways to reduce the amount of sand needed on oil wells. Over 100 submissions were received from applicants in more than 30 countries. Technical experts and management from Statoil and GE Oil & Gas served as judges. The winners were announced in July 2015 and were awarded an initial cash prize of US$25,000, with the potential to receive additional funding from a discretionary prize pool of US$375,000 for potential development or commercialization upon meeting certain additional conditions.

The second Open Innovation Challenge was issued in July 2015 and asked entrants to find solutions for reducing fresh water usage and improving water treatment in the development of onshore unconventional oil and gas reservoirs. The winners were announced in February 2016 and received the same prize.

In February 2016 GE Oil & Gas signed a master service agreement with Statoil for new subsea projects that will enable GE to continue to support Statoil in a low oil price environment. The global agreement forms the basis for potential new contracts for subsea equipment and services on new projects and field developments and is valid globally until 2025.

=== PT Donggi Senoro LNG ===
In November 2015 GE Oil & Gas announced they had signed a Contractual Service Agreement with Asian energy company PT Donggi Senoro LNG. The agreement will see GE Oil & Gas provide full package services and monitor non-GE equipment supplied by other Original Equipment Manufacturers (OEMs). The long-term deal is a milestone for GE Oil & Gas as they will act as a single contractual supplier.
