= Koji Nakanishi =

Japanese chemist (1925–2019)

Koji Nakanishi 中西 香爾
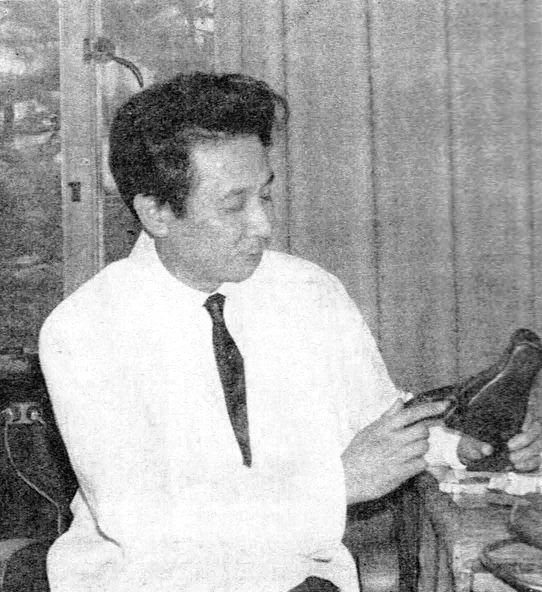
- Nakanishi in 1967
- Born: 11 May 1925; British Hong Kong
- Died: 28 March 2019 (aged 93); New York, New York, U.S.
- Citizenship: Japan
- Education: Nagoya University
- Awards: Ernest Guenther Award (1978); Japan Academy Prize (1990); Imperial Prize of the Japan Academy (1990); Arthur C. Cope Award (1990); Scheele Award (1992); William H. Nichols Medal (1992); Welch Award (1996); Person of Cultural Merit (1999); King Faisal International Prize (2003); Order of Culture (2007)
- Scientific career
- Fields: Chemistry
- Workplaces: Tokyo University of Education; Tohoku University; Columbia University
- Thesis: ロゼオスライシンから得られた二種のアミノ酸の構造 (1954)
- Doctoral advisor: Yoshimasa Hirata
- Doctoral students: Ge Li
- Other notable students: Satoshi Ōmura

Koji Nakanishi (中西 香爾, Nakanishi Kōji; May 11, 1925 – March 28, 2019) was a Japanese chemist who studied bioorganic chemistry and natural products. He served as Centennial Professor of Chemistry and chair of the Chemistry Department at Columbia University.

== Early life ==
Nakanishi was born in Hong Kong on May 11, 1925. He first attended the British Boys' School in Alexandria, Egypt. Once he turned 10 his family and he moved back to Japan, where he would attend Yamate primary for a year before transferring over to the junior division of Konan High school. He first applied to Tokyo University only to be rejected, after which he applied and was accepted to Nagoya University. He received his bachelor's degree in chemistry from Nagoya University in 1947 from Prof. Fujio Egami. Following two years of post-graduate work with Prof. Louis Fieser at Harvard University, he returned to Nagoya University where he completed his Ph.D. in 1954 with Yoshimasa Hirata.

== Career ==
Nakanishi took a position as an assistant professor at Nagoya, and then professor of chemistry at Tokyo University of Education (now the University of Tsukuba). In 1963 he moved to Tohoku University in Sendai and remained there until 1969 when he joined the faculty of Columbia University. In 1980 he became Centennial Professor of Chemistry. He was chairman of the Chemistry Department from 1987 to 1990.

Nakanishi was a founding member and one of the six directors of research at the International Centre of Insect Physiology and Ecology in Kenya, the first director of the nonprofit Suntory Institute for Bioorganic Research (Sunbor), Osaka, and he assisted the Brazilian government to set up a center of excellence in the Amazons, the Institute of Medicinal and Ecological Chemistry with its headquarters in São Paulo. In April 2001 he was asked to start a chemistry unit within Biosphere 2, Arizona, operated by Columbia University.

Nakanishi's research encompassed isolation, structural and bioorganic studies of bioactive compounds, retinal proteins, interaction between ligands and neuroreceptors, development of various spectroscopic methods, especially circular dichroic spectroscopy. He has published around 750 papers, and authored, co-authored, or edited nine books on spectroscopy and natural products.

Nakanishi determined the structures of over 200 biologically active animal and plant natural products, many of which are endogenous and/or the first member of a new class. These include ginkgolides from the ancient ginkgo tree, first insect molting hormones from plants, new nucleic acid bases, insect antifeedants, antibiotics, first meiosis inducing substance from starfish, crustacean molt inhibitors, shark repellents from fish, tunicate blood pigments, brevetoxins from red-tide dinoflagellates, philanthotoxin (glutamate and nicotinic acetylcholine receptor antagonist) from a wasp, and the human eye pigment involved in macular degeneration.

Nakanishi's studies with retinal analogs and retinal proteins made seminal contributions in understanding the structural and mechanistic basis of animal vision and phototaxis. In 2000, his research group succeeded in clarifying relative movements of the retinal and the opsin receptor throughout the visual transduction process; this was the first such study performed with G protein-coupled receptors (GPCR) and contributed in clarifying the mode of action of numerous other GPCRs. It also established the structure and biosynthesis of the fluorescent pigment A2E that leads to the incurable eye disease age-related macular degeneration (AMD) and its involvement in apoptosis.

Nakanishi's spectroscopic contributions included the first applications of the NMR nuclear Overhauser effect in structure determination during the ginkgolide studies (1967), and in particular development of the exciton coupled circular dichroic method (1969), a non-empirical sub-microgram scale technique for determining various aspects of molecular chirality of organic molecules in solution, an extremely versatile technique applicable to compounds ranging from small molecules to various types of ligand/receptor complexes.

As of December 2002, approximately 425 students and postdoctoral fellows spent a period of time in his group, i.e., 95 in Japan and 330 at Columbia University. About 140 of his former colleagues hold academic positions at universities.

== Recognition ==
Nakanishi received awards from the US, Japan, Bulgaria, China, the Czech Republic, the Netherlands, Italy, Saudi Arabia, Sweden (the Scheele Award, 1992), Switzerland, Taiwan, and the UK. In an unprecedented international alliance, the Nakanishi Prize of the American Chemical Society (ACS) and the Chemical Society of Japan (CSJ) was established in 1995 and is awarded in alternate years in Japan and the U.S. to recognize achievements in chemical and spectroscopic methods to the study of biological phenomena; it is the only CSJ prize with an individual's name. In 1999, he was awarded one of Japan's highest honors, "Person of Cultural Merit" for his breakthrough research in the organic chemistry of natural products.

His many honors include the prestigious King Faisal International Prize in Science, the Welch Award, the Arthur C. Cope Award, the Paul Karrer Gold Medal, the Imperial Prize of the Japan Academy, the National Academy of Sciences Award in Chemical Sciences, the Tetrahedron Prize (2004) and the Japan Academy Prize, as well as honorary doctorates from Williams College, Georgetown University and the University of Uppsala. He was also awarded the 'Pure Chemistry' award, given to notable chemists under the age of 35, by the American Chemical Society, in 1956 when he was 31.

== Bibliography ==
- A Wandering Natural Products Chemist (1991)

== Personal life ==
When Nakanishi appeared at a reception where he was scheduled to receive an award or to present a scientific paper, the audience could most generally expect an added spectacular surprise treat, as he was also an accomplished, amateur magician.

Nakanishi married Yasuko Abe in 1945 (d. 2008). They have two children: Keiko and Jun; three grandchildren: Aya, J. Kenji López-Alt, and Pico; and a great-granddaughter and two great-grandsons.

The Nobel Prize winner Satoshi Ōmura was Nakanishi's student at Tokyo University of Education. He was the doctoral advisor of Chinese billionaire, WuXi AppTec founder Ge Li at Columbia University.
