= List of largest companies in Ireland =

List of Irish companies in order of various fiscal metrics

This article lists the largest companies in Ireland in terms of their revenue, net profit and total assets, according to the American business magazines Fortune and Forbes. A large part of companies on both lists are registered in Ireland for tax purposes. Data from Global Database, a UK-based B2B provider of company information, is also incorporated.

== 2024 Global Database list ==
This list is based on data from Global Database, which ranks the TOP 3 companies in Ireland by sales revenue. The ranking is derived from the reported financial results for the year 2024 and includes key indicators such as revenue, operating income, net income, total assets, and total equity. The table also presents each company’s headquarters location, number of employees (where available), and primary industry or business function. All financial figures represent the most recent data available for the fiscal year 2023/2024.

Rank	Name	Headquarters	Revenue (€ billion)	Operating Income (€ billion)	Net Income (€ billion)	Total Assets (€ billion)	Total Equity (€ billion)	Employees
▲1	United Airlines	Dublin	▲51.96	▲4.64	▲2.37	▲67.43	▲11.56	<100 (in Ireland)
▲2	Eli Lilly and Company	Dublin (via Irish entity)	▲40.99	▲11.74	▲9.63	▲71.62	▲12.91	47000
▼3	CRH	Dublin	▼31.81	▼3.81	▼ -2.80	▲43.19	▼ -18.97	75,000+

== 2022 Fortune list ==
This list displays all 3 Irish companies in the Fortune Global 500, which ranks the world's largest companies by annual revenue. The figures below are given in millions of US dollars and are for the fiscal year 2021. Also listed are the headquarters location, net profit, number of employees worldwide and industry sector of each company.

Rank	Fortune 500 rank	Name	Industry	Revenue (USD millions)	Profits (USD millions)	Assets (USD millions)	Employees	Headquarters
1	▲268	Accenture	Services	50,533.4	5,906.8	43,175.8	624,000	Dublin
2	▼460	CRH plc	Building materials	30,981.0	2,565.0	44,670.0	77,400	Dublin
▲3	▼473	Medtronic	Health care	30,117	3,606	93,083	90,000	Dublin

== 2022 Forbes list ==
This list is based on the Forbes Global 2000, which ranks the world's 2,000 largest publicly traded companies. The Forbes list takes into account a multitude of factors, including the revenue, net profit, total assets and market value of each company; each factor is given a weighted rank in terms of importance when considering the overall ranking. The table below also lists the headquarters location and industry sector of each company. The figures are in billions of US dollars and are for the year 2021.

Rank	Forbes 2000 rank	Name	Headquarters	Revenue (billions US$)	Profit (billions US$)	Assets (billions US$)	Value (billions US$)	Industry
▲1	▲167	Medtronic	Dublin	31.79	4.91	91.8	144.62	Health care
2	▲183	Accenture	Dublin	56.70	6.39	44.32	196.86	Professional Services
▲3	▲351	CRH plc	Dublin	31.00	2.57	44.67	31.77	Building materials
4	▼397	Eaton Corporation	Dublin	19.63	2.14	34.03	58.35	Conglomerate
▼5	▼399	Johnson Controls	Cork	29.40	2.3	48.00	33.5	Industrials
▲6	▲553	Aon	Dublin	12.19	1.57	42.22	44.22	Services
▲7	▲702	Trane Technologies	Dublin	14.14	1.42	18.06	34.77	Manufacturing
▲8	▲867	Bank of Ireland	Dublin	5.90	0.70	141.40	7.20	Banking
▲9	▼907	Seagate Technology	Dublin	11.97	1.84	9.38	18.04	IT services
▼10	▼959	Aptiv	Dublin	15.62	0.59	18.01	28.85	Automotive
▲11	▲996	AerCap	Dublin	4.52	1.00	74.57	12.59	Transportation
▲12	▼1202	Kerry Group	Tralee	7.80	0.60	9.50	19.20	Food processing
▲13	▲1213	Experian	Dublin	5.94	0.98	10.39	32.22	Services
▼14	▼1307	Allied Irish Banks	Dublin	3.33	0.72	145.42	6.09	Banking
▲15	▲1316	Flutter Entertainment	Dublin	8.33	−0.57	22.72	18.66	Bookmaking
▲16	▲1350	Smurfit Kappa Group	Dublin	11.94	0.80	13.59	11.01	Packaging
▲17	▲1488	Kingspan Group	Kingscourt	7.68	0.65	7.26	17.53	Building materials
▼18	▼1791	DCC plc	Dublin	20.52	0.40	10.94	7.58	Services
▲19	▲1820	Horizon Therapeutics	Dublin	3.23	0.53	8.68	24.25	Pharmaceutical
▲20	▲1825	ICON	Dublin	5.48	0.15	17.39	19.08	Pharmaceutical
▲21	▲1951	Steris	Galway	4.25	0.28	11.69	23.38	Medical devices

== See also ==
- List of companies of Ireland
- List of largest companies by revenue
