= ViS Research =

ViS Research, Inc.
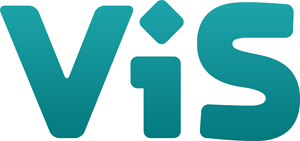
- Company type: Incorporated
- Industry: Clinical Research Analytics; Technology; Information Technology; Analytics
- Founded: New York City, USA (2013)
- Founder: Fabio Thiers, MD, PhD
- Headquarters: New York City
- Number of locations: United States
- Area served: Worldwide
- Key people: Fabio Thiers (CEO)
- Products: Location Analytics; Center Analytics; Analytics Services
- Number of employees: 50+ (April 1, 2013)
- Website: www.visresearch.com

ViS Research was an American company that conducted clinical trial planning with a site feasibility platform. The ViS online platform provided tools and analytics to pharmaceutical and biotechnology companies and contract research organizations. Its objective was to transform how locations, research centers, and investigators were evaluated for inclusion in clinical trials.

ViS was acquired by IQVIA (formerly known as IMS Health - Quintiles) in June 2015.
