= Dokumeds =

European Clinical Research Organization

DOKUMEDS
- Company type: Private
- Industry: Contract research organization; Pharmaceutical; Medical device; Life sciences; Consulting
- Founded: 1995; 31 years ago
- Headquarters: Riga, Latvia
- Services: Support services for pharmaceutical, biotech and medical companies
- Revenue: 8,307,219 euro (2022)
- Net income: 867,980 euro (2022)
- Total assets: 5,032,347 euro (2022)
- Number of employees: 63 (2022)
- Website: www.dokumeds.com

DOKUMEDS is European Clinical Research Organization (CRO) providing a comprehensive range of services for clinical research, focused primarily on Phase I-IV clinical trials and development for pharmaceutical, biotechnology and medical device industries. Established in 1995, Dokumeds has been expanding its coverage and services significantly over 25 years of operations. Gradual geographical and operational coverage expansion has correlated with company staff growth and lowering of employee turnover. Nowadays Dokumeds is a leading international CRO with operational capabilities in 30+ countries in Europe, Africa, and other regions.

== Services ==
Apart from a full cycle of services for Phase I – IV clinical development programs, Dokumeds functional service provision capabilities include:

- Feasibility Services
- Study Start-up services
- Regulatory consultancy & submissions
- Contract & Payment management
- IP & Supply logistics
- Training
- Medical monitoring & Medical review
- Medical writing
- Pharmacovigilance
- Enrollment Liaison
- Outsourcing of staff
- Site audits

== Offices ==
DOKUMEDS has offices in:

- Russia
- Ukraine
- Poland
- Latvia
- Lithuania
- Estonia
- Bulgaria
- Germany
- Romania
- South Africa

== Experience ==
DOKUMEDS has been operating in the field of clinical trials for 25 years, founded in 1995. Headquartered in Riga, Latvia, I was acquired by Rho in 2021.
