= WuXi Biologics =

Chinese pharmaceutical company

- Company type: Public
- Traded as: SEHK: 2269; Hang Seng Index Component
- ISIN: KYG970081173
- Industry: Biotechnology company; Pharmaceutical industry
- Founded: 2015; 11 years ago in Wuxi City, China
- Headquarters: Primary: 108 Meiliang Road, Mashan, Binhu District, Wuxi, Jiangsu, China, 214092
- Area served: Worldwide
- Key people: Zhisheng (Chris) Chen (Chief executive officer); Jijie Gu (Chief scientific officer, Executive Vice President); Weichang Zhou (Chief technology officer, Executive Vice President); Christine Lu-Wong (Chief financial officer, Executive Vice President)
- Parent: WuXi AppTec
- Subsidiaries: WuXi Vaccines; CMAB Biopharma Group
- Website: www.wuxibiologics.com

WuXi Biologics is a global Contract Research Development and Manufacturing Organization (CRDMO) that provides open-access, integrated technology platforms for biologics drug development.

WuXi Biologics' roots date back to 2010, when it was founded as a division of WuXi AppTec and began building out capabilities and facilities required for biologics discovery, development and good manufacturing practices (GMP). After being spun off from its parent, WuXi Biologics went public on the Hong Kong Stock Exchange in June 2017.

As of 2021, WuXi Biologics has 18 manufacturing sites including ten in China, three in the United States, two in Ireland, two in Germany, and one in Singapore.

In August 2020, WuXi Biologics was selected to become a component of the Hang Seng Index in Hong Kong.

In January 2024, WuXi Biologics' share price fell on news that the United States Congress had introduced legislation to block any federal government contracts with the company due to national security concerns. The concerns stem from allegations, denied by the company, that it has worked closely with the People's Liberation Army as a part of the Chinese Communist Party's military-civil fusion strategy. Members of the United States House Select Committee on Strategic Competition between the United States and the Chinese Communist Party subsequently called for sanctions against WuXi Biologics.

== Facilities in Asia ==
=== Shanghai, China ===
WuXi Biologics has two sites in Shanghai, one in the Shanghai Waigaoqiao Free Trade Zone and the other in Fengxian.

=== Wuxi, China ===
WuXi Biologics has two sites located in Wuxi City, China. The Mashan site contains MFG1, MFG2, MFG4 and MFG5. and the Wuxi New Area site contains labs dedicated to the antibody drug conjugate development and production.

=== Hangzhou, China ===
As of March 2021, WuXi Biologics will have two sites in Hangzhou China.

On March 17, 2021, WuXi Biologics announced an equity agreement with Pfizer China to acquire its newly built $350 million Hangzhou global biotechnology center site and facilities (MFG20). Opened in 2020 and slated to be GMP-ready in 2021, the Hangzhou site (MFG13) is home to facilities dedicated to the development and GMP manufacture of recombinant proteins and plasmid DNA produced via microbial fermentation along with separate facilities for the development and production of a viral-based vaccine.

=== Suzhou, China ===
As of March 2021, WuXi Biologics will have two sites located in the city of Suzhou, China.

On March 18, 2021, WuXi Biologics announced a purchase agreement with CBC Group which will allow it to acquire over a 90% interest in CMAB Biopharma Group. The transaction is expected to close in the second quarter of 2021. Along with the controlling stake, WuXi Biologics will also acquire a 7000L bioreactor capacity manufacturing facility (MFG21) in Suzhou and associated liquid and lyophilization (DP21) fill and finish production lines. A second site, opened in 2014 is 108,716 sq ft (10,100.0 m^{2}) and was the first non-governmentally affiliated biosafety testing facility in Asia. The facility performs cell line characterization, viral clearance validation studies, and unprocessed bulk lot release.

=== Chengdu, China ===
Currently slated to open in 2023, the Chengdu facility (MFG12) will be a 1.3×10^{6} sq ft (120×10^{3} m^{2}), with an integrated manufacturing center for innovative biologics and dedicated to R&D and commercial-scale bulk active pharmaceutical ingredient (API) production with an initial bioreactor capacity of 48,000 liters (11,000 imp gal; 13,000 U.S. gal) for commercial production and 5,000 liters (1,100 imp gal; 1,300 U.S. gal) for clinical production.

=== Shijiazhuang, China ===
Currently slated to open in 2022, the Shijiazhuang facility MFG8 will be 884,363 sq ft (82,160.0 m^{2}) and dedicated to development and API manufacturing with an initial bioreactor capacity of 48,000 liters.

=== Singapore ===
On May 24, 2018, WuXi Biologics announced it will be building a $60 million facility (MFG10) in Singapore which will feature an initial bioreactor capacity of 4,500 liters made up of two 2,000 liter fed-batch reactors and one 500 liter continuous processing perfusion reactor to open in 2023.

== Facilities in Europe ==
=== Leverkusen, Germany Facility ===
On January 17, 2020, WuXi Biologics and Bayer announced an acquisition agreement in which WuXi Biologics would take over the operations and lease a 139,931 sq ft (13,000.0 m^{2}) fill site in Leverkusen, Germany. Based on the agreement, the site would perform the final fill-finish of various biologics products produced by WuXi's API sites, and act as a backup for filling operations for Bayer's Kovaltry anti-hemophilic infusions which are primarily finished in another plant in Berkeley, California.

=== Wuppertal, Germany Facility ===
On December 21, 2020, WuXi Biologics and Bayer announced a new acquisition agreement for a drug substance (DS) production site for €150 million in Wuppertal, Germany.

=== Dundalk, Ireland Site ===
==== Active ingredient production facilities ====
In April 2018, WuXi Biologics announced plans to build a new biologics drug substance manufacturing facility on 26 hectares (64 acres) in Dundalk, Ireland. The project is directly supported by the Irish Government through IDA Ireland, with a cost of approximately $394 million. When completed, the facility will be one of the world's largest plants supporting single-use bioreactors and will help accelerate the development of biologic drugs in Europe. MFG6 will have a perfusion bioreactor capacity of 6,000 liters in a continuous bioprocessing configuration and MFG7 will have a 48,000 liter bioreactor capacity in a traditional fed-batch configuration.

==== Vaccine production facility ====
In November 2019, WuXi Vaccines, a subsidiary of WuXi Biologics, announced that it would invest an additional $240 million to build a new 167,056 sq ft (15,520.0 m^{2}) vaccine manufacturing facility at the Dundalk, Ireland site. The vaccine site planned includes drug substance manufacturing facilities, drug product manufacturing, Manufacturing Science and Technology Labs as well as Quality Control labs. In February 2020, WuXi Vaccines announced it had signed a 20-year, $3 billion contract with an unidentified "global vaccine leader" to produce one of the unidentified company's vaccine products at the new facility.

== Facilities in the United States ==
=== Massachusetts ===
In May 2020, WuXi Biologics announced that it had secured a deal with the Worcester Business Development Corporation at The Reactory, a master-planned manufacturing hub project in Worcester, Massachusetts. The two-story, 107,000 sq ft (9,900 m^{2}) facility will cost $60 million and will employ 150 when it is completed in 2022. The Worcester City Council granted a 20-year, $11.5 million tax increment financing plan to help seal the deal. The new facility will have 16,000 liters of bioreactor capacity, which will include four 4,000-liter traditional fed-batch units and one 500-liter perfusion-based continuous processing unit and will be named MFG11.

=== New Jersey ===
In June 2020, WuXi Biologics announced that it had signed a ten-year lease for a 66,000 sq ft (6,100 m^{2}) clinical manufacturing facility (MFG18) in Cranbury, NJ. The facility had previously been leased by Outlook Therapeutics and will install a total of 6,000 liters (1,300 imp gal; 1,600 U.S. gal) of bioreactor capacity, process development, and quality control labs, along with supporting functions.

=== Pennsylvania ===
In May 2020, WuXi Biologics announced it had leased a 33,000 sq ft (3,100 m^{2}) process development lab in King of Prussia, Pennsylvania at Discovery Labs, a former GlaxoSmithKline manufacturing site. In 2024, WuXi announced that the site in King of Prussia would cease operations.
