= Authorization for Use of Military Force Against Iraq Resolution of 1991 =

Authorizing the Gulf War, also known as Operation Desert Storm

Authorization for Use of Military Force Against Iraq Resolution
- Long title: Joint Resolution to authorize the use of United States Armed Forces pursuant to United Nations Security Council Resolution 678.
- Enacted by: the 102nd United States Congress
- Effective: January 14, 1991

Citations
- Public law: Pub. L. 102–1
- Statutes at Large: 105 Stat. 3

Legislative history
- Introduced in the House as H.J.Res.77 by Robert H. Michel (R–IL) on Jan. 12, 1991; Passed the House on Jan. 12, 1991 (250 - 183); Passed the Senate as the S.J.Res.2 on Jan. 12, 1991 (52 - 47); Signed into law by President George H. W. Bush on Jan. 14, 1991

Major amendments
- Repealed by the National Defense Authorization Act for Fiscal Year 2026

The Authorization for Use of Military Force Against Iraq Resolution (short title) (Pub. L. 102–1) or Joint Resolution to authorize the use of United States Armed Forces pursuant to United Nations Security Council Resolution 678 (official title), was the United States Congress's January 14, 1991, authorization of the use of U.S. military force in the Gulf War.

President George H. W. Bush requested a congressional joint resolution on January 8, 1991, one week before the January 15, 1991, deadline issued to Iraq specified by the November 29, 1990 United Nations United Nations Security Council Resolution 678. President Bush had deployed over 500,000 U.S. troops without congressional authorization to Saudi Arabia and the Persian Gulf region in the preceding five months in response to Iraq's August 2, 1990, invasion of Kuwait.

It was repealed by the National Defense Authorization Act for Fiscal Year 2026.

== Legislative history ==
Senate Joint Resolution 2 was approved in the United States Senate on January 12, 1991, by a vote of 52 to 47.

- S.J.Res. 2 was sponsored by John Warner (R) with 34 cosponsors — 29 Republicans and 5 Democrats. (The Democrats were: Howell Heflin, Bennett Johnston, Joe Lieberman, Chuck Robb, and Richard Shelby).
- Approved 52–47 at 2:44 PM EST on Saturday, January 12, 1991.
  - Democrats: 10–45. 10 (18%) of 56 Democratic Senators voted for the resolution: John Breaux, Richard Bryan, Al Gore, Bob Graham, Howell Heflin, Bennett Johnston, Joe Lieberman, Harry Reid, Chuck Robb, Richard Shelby
  - Republicans: 42–2. Chuck Grassley and Mark Hatfield voted against the resolution.

House Joint Resolution 77 was approved in the United States House of Representatives on January 12, 1991, by a vote of 250 to 183

- H.J.Res. 77 was sponsored by House minority leader Bob Michel (R) with 31 cosponsors — 14 Republicans and 17 Democrats (The Democrats were: Gary Ackerman, Les Aspin, Howard Berman, Dante Fascell, Tom Lantos, Greg Laughlin (R), Mel Levine, Marilyn Lloyd, Dave McCurdy, Charles Thomas McMillen, Gillespie V. Montgomery, John Murtha, Ike Skelton, Stephen J. Solarz, Charles Stenholm, Robert Torricelli, and Harold Volkmer).
- Approved: 250–183 at 3:51 PM EST on Saturday, January 12, 1991.
  - Democrats: 86–179. 86 (32%) of 267 Democrats voted for the resolution.
    - Mervyn M. Dymally and Mo Udall were ill and did not vote, but would have voted against the resolution.
  - Republicans: 164–3. Reps. Silvio Conte, Connie Morella, Frank Riggs voted against the resolution.
  - Independent: 0–1. Rep. Bernie Sanders (I) voted against the resolution.
- House Joint Resolution 77 was then approved by the Senate by unanimous consent.
- House Joint Resolution 77 was signed by President George H. W. Bush on January 14, 1991, and became Pub. L. 102–1.

== Repeal ==
On June 29, 2021, the U.S. House of Representatives voted 366–46 to repeal the authorization, along with the 1957 authorization of intervention in the Middle East as part of the Eisenhower Doctrine. On March 16, 2023, a bill to repeal the 1991 and 2002 AUMFs, introduced by Tim Kaine and Todd Young, was advanced by the Senate by 68 votes to 27.

== See also ==
- United Nations Security Council Resolution 660
- United Nations Security Council Resolution 678
