= Wellstream =

Wellstream Holdings plc
- Type: Subsidiary
- Industry: Engineering
- Founded: 1983
- Headquarters: Newcastle upon Tyne, United Kingdom
- Key people: John W. Kennedy (Chairman of the board); Gordon Chapman (Chief Executive Officer)
- Products: Flexible risers and pipelines
- Revenue: £386.1 million (2009)
- Operating income: £50.8 million (2009)
- Net income: £34.5 million (2009)
- Number of employees: circa 1,000 (2010)
- Parent: Baker Hughes Company
- Website: www.wellstream.com

Wellstream Holdings plc was a British company which designed and manufactured flexible pipeline systems for the oil and gas industry. It was listed on the London Stock Exchange and was a constituent of the FTSE 250 Index before being acquired by General Electric in February 2011, then later sold off as part of Baker Hughes Company.

== History ==
The company was founded in Panama City, Florida in 1983 as a supplier of equipment to offshore developers. Wellstream was acquired by Dresser Industries in 1995 and subsequently became part of Halliburton when it merged with Dresser in 1998. Halliburton sold off Wellstream to a Candover-led consortium for $136 million in 2003, which in turn listed the firm on the London Stock Exchange in April 2007. Candover remained Wellstream's largest shareholder with an approximate 14% stake until April 2008, when the block of shares was put up for sale in its entirety.

General Electric agreed to buy the company in December 2010, shortly after GE had agreed to buy Dresser. In 2020 the Oil & Gas business of GE was separated and eventually sold down by GE as Baker Hughes Company, reinstating a brand which GE had also bought in 2017 and merged with its own Oil & Gas division to form BHGE.

The Baker Hughes Company is now an energy technology company sold on New York's Nasdaq exchange under the ticker BKR.

== Operations ==
The company is based in Newcastle upon Tyne, with major manufacturing facilities also located in Niterói, Brazil.

== See also ==
- List of oilfield service companies
