= Medpace =

Medical Services Corporation

Medpace Holdings, Inc.
- Formerly: Medical Research Services (1992-bef.2014)
- Type: Public
- Traded as: Nasdaq: MEDP; S&P 400 component
- Industry: Contract Research Organization
- Founded: 1992; 34 years ago
- Headquarters: Cincinnati, Ohio, U.S.
- Area served: ▲ Over 40 countries (2023)
- Key people: August J. Troendle (CEO & chairman of the board of directors)
- Products: Support services for pharmaceutical, biotech, and medical device companies
- Revenue: ▲US$2.53 billion (2025)
- Net income: ▲US$451 million (2025)
- Number of employees: 6,500 (2026)
- Website: medpace.com

Medpace Holdings, Inc. is a global clinical research organization (CRO) based in Cincinnati, Ohio, employing approximately 6,500 people. Operating under a full-service model, the company also offers global central laboratory, imaging and ECG core laboratory, and bioanalytical laboratory services, as well as a Phase I unit located on its headquarters and clinical research campus in Cincinnati, Ohio.

The company started trading stock as a public firm in 2016.

== Operations ==
Medpace is a full-service contract research organization that manages Phase 1 through Phase IV clinical development programs for pharmaceutical, biotechnology, and medical device companies. Its services include development-plan and protocol design, project management, regulatory affairs, clinical monitoring, data management and analysis, and post-marketing support. Its principal operating regions are North America, Europe, Latin America, and Asia Pacific.

== History ==
August Troendle founded Medpace in Cincinnati, Ohio, in 1992 as Medical Research Services. Troendle first became interested in the CRO sector after working in both the regulatory and pharmaceutical area. He began his career as a reviewer with the FDA, specializing in the development of lipid lowering therapies to treat high cholesterol.

With a team of industry physicians, Jonathan Issacsohn and Evan Stein completed many early studies while at Medpace and Medpace Reference Laboratories on the use of statin therapies for the treatment of hypercholesterolemia. Another Medpace physician, David Orloff was regarded as an industry opinion leader in the study of metabolic diseases – most specifically diabetes and obesity. Troendle was honored for his work as a Medpace founder in 2012 by the Cincinnati Chamber of Commerce.

Medpace completed construction on a new campus in 2012 in Madisonville, a neighborhood on the eastern side of Cincinnati. The project encompassed revitalizing an urban brownfield site formerly occupied by NuTone, and creating a state of the art LEED (Leadership in Energy and Environmental Design) certified campus.

In 2022, Medpace announced a $150 million capital investment to expand its headquarters in Cincinnati, Ohio, adding an estimated expansion of 1,500 new jobs.

Medpace expanded internationally through several acquisitions between 2007 and 2012. It acquired the Czech Republic contract research organization Monax in 2007, followed by Switzerland-based PharmaBrains AG in 2009. In 2010, Medpace acquired the Minneapolis medical-device consultancy Symbios and Germany's Medical Consulting Dr. Schlichtiger GmbH. In 2012 they acquired MediTech BV, a medical device consultancy based in the Netherlands.

== Ownership ==
In 2011, CCMP Capital acquired 80% of the firm for US$285 million. Three years later, in February 2014, CCMP auctioned their 80% stake; the winner was won by Cinven, who paid US$900 million. In August 2017, Medpace went became a publicly traded company with its initial public offering, selling 8,050,000 shares of common stock.

== Corporate affairs ==
=== Head Office Locations ===
Medpace Holdings, Inc. is headquartered in Cincinnati, Ohio, United States. The company’s main campus, known as the Medpace Campus, is located in the Madisonville neighborhood of Cincinnati and includes multiple office buildings, laboratories, and clinical facilities.

In addition to its headquarters, Medpace operates regional offices and clinical sites across North America, Europe, Asia Pacific, and Latin America to support global clinical trial operations.

=== Financial performance ===
Medpace Holdings, Inc. has demonstrated strong revenue and income growth since going public in 2016, maintaining a steady upward trajectory in operating and net income over the last several years.

Year	Revenue (USD billion)	Gross Profit (USD billion)	Net Income (USD billion)
2013	0.27	0.12	0.02
2015	0.36	0.15	-0.08
2017	0.43	0.17	0.04
2020	0.93	0.28	0.14
2021	1.14	0.33	0.18
2022	1.46	0.43	0.24
2023	1.89	0.52	0.28
2024	2.11	0.66	0.40
2025	2.53	0.76	0.45
