= PRA Health Sciences =

Contract research company

- PRA Health Sciences logo 2014
- Type: Subsidiary
- Traded as: Nasdaq: PRAH
- Industry: Pharmaceuticals & Biotechnology
- Founded: 1976; 50 years ago Charlottesville, Virginia, U.S.
- Headquarters: Raleigh, North Carolina, U.S.
- Area served: Worldwide
- Key people: Colin Shannon (President and CEO)
- Revenue: ▲US$ 1.948 billion (2017); ▲US$ 1.580 billion (2016)
- Number of employees: 17,000+
- Parent: ICON plc
- Website: prahs.com

PRA Health Sciences was a contract research organization (CRO) with headquarters in Raleigh, North Carolina. It was established in 1976 and acquired by ICON in 2021.

== Background ==
PRA was founded as the Anti-Inflammatory Drug Study Group in 1976, renamed PRA in 1982, as it expanded into other therapeutic areas besides inflammation. In 2013 the company was acquired by Kohlberg Kravis Roberts, which brought the company public in November 2014 and maintained shares until September 2019. In August 2017, the company acquired Conshohocken-based real-world healthcare data, analytics, and technology solutions company Symphony Health for US$530 million. PRA's 2018 revenue was US$2.87 billion. PRA was acquired by ICON PLC on 1 July 2021.
