= Hillman Solutions =

American manufacturer of building materials and household hardware

Hillman Solutions Corp.
- Type: Public
- Traded as: Nasdaq: HLMN
- ISIN: US4316361090
- Industry: hardware
- Predecessors: Sun Distributors, Sunsource
- Founded: 1964; 62 years ago in Cincinnati, Ohio
- Founder: Max W. Hillman
- Headquarters: Forest Park, Ohio, USA
- Area served: Canada, Mexico, USA
- Key people: Jon Michael Adinolfi (Chairman, President & Chief Executive Officer)
- Website: hillmangroup.com

Hillman Solutions is an American hardware manufacturing, distribution and consumer fabrication services company.

== History ==
Hillman was acquired in 1982 by Sun Distributors, L.P., a Philadelphia-based diversified industrial supply and services company founded in 1975. For many years, Hillman Faster was one of many operating divisions and the only one focused on retail merchandising. The two other divisions of Sun sold maintenance and power fluid products and inventory management services to industrial customers, and glass products and services to construction and retail buyers.

Sun Distributors changed its name to Sunsource Inc. in early 1996. Over the years the company divested of many of its divisions. In 1994 the Dorman automotive repair parts unit was sold to competitor R&B Inc. for $43.3 million. The Harding Glass Company, with $118 million in annual sales, was sold to Mexico's Vitro SA.

Solidifying its focal shift from industrial to retail customers in 1999, Sunsource financed its Axxess key cutting acquisitions (see below) by selling off two fastener units, Kar Products and A&H Bolt and Nut Company, to Glencoe Capital, which sold them on to Barnes Group in 2003.

Sunsource changed its name to The Hillman Companies, Inc. in March 2002 after a majority stake in the company was acquired by Allied Capital Corporation. Two years later, Code Hennessy & Simmons acquired control of Hillman.

The private equity firm Oak Hill Capital Partners bought Hillman for $815 million in 2010 and resold a controlling majority to CCMP Capital Advisors $1.46 billion in 2014.

The company went public on NASDAQ in 2021. The relisting was effected through a merger with a special-purpose acquisition company, Landcadia III, in 2021. The "blank check" company that Hillman merged into was one of a series of Landcadia entities led by Tilman Fertitta. CCMP retained a sizeable stake in Hillman at the time of the SPAC and is gradually selling out of its position.

=== Acquisitions ===
Hillman's pace of acquisitions accelerated into a private-equity fueled rollup as the company expanded into new segments adjacent to its original building hardware product line through corporate acquisitions.

==== Key cutting ====
While the still part of the Sun conglomerate, Hillman acquired the retail division of Curtis Industries of Eastlake, Ohio, in 1995. Curtis manufactured primarily key blanks and key cutting machines, with a focus on car dealerships and "home centers". Curtis made approximately $17 million in retail sales annually.

In 2000, the Sunsource parent acquired Axxess Technologies Inc. The Tempe-based company manufactured key duplication and identification-engraving vending systems. The purchase was expressly linked to the divestiture of the Kar and A&H industrial divisions.

==== Metal stock ====
In January 2006 Hillman acquired the metal sheets and shapes business, as well as the brand name, of The SteelWorks Corporation based Denver, Colorado. Other product lines of the Denver, Colorado-based company were rebranded Acme Manufacturing Company.

==== Fastener distributors ====
In December 2007 Hillman acquired All Points Industries, distributor based in Pompano Beach, Florida and focused on hurricane protection fasteners.

Hillman acquired Serv-A-Lite, another distributor of fasteners and related hardware. Serv-A-lite was established in 1979 and based in East Moline, Illinois. The Servalite trademark is now applied to some electric lamp hardware.

Hillman bought a sizeable Canadian rival distributor H. Paulin for $103 million in February 2013

==== Self-service duplication and engraving ====
Hillman acquired several inventions of Flagstaff, Arizona-based George Lynn Hagen. It acquired outright the TagWorks company, which made automated, self-service pet tag engraving machines, in March 2011. Hillman also bought key duplication know-how from KeyWorks-KeyExpress. Hagen had also been at executive in the Axxess company merged into Hillman decades earlier.

==== Picture hangers ====
Hillman acquired the consumer brand OOK and certain other assets related to picture hanging hardware from the Micasa Trading Corporation. The transaction was announced in December 2011. Micasa was based in Miami, Florida and had annual revenue of $10 million in the preceding year.

==== Roofing and specialty fasteners ====
In November 2017 Hillman acquired Tyler, Texas-based Hargis Industries, which operates under the umbrella brand ST Fastening Systems and manufactures fasteners and sealing products for principally for metal buildings. ST brands include Deck Plus, MultiVent, Power Pro, Roofjack, SnowTrax, Steelbinder, and Woodbinder.

In August 2026, Hillman acquired industrial fastener distributor Kanebridge Corporation for $315 million. Kanebridge supplies more than 44,000 commercial and military-grade fasteners from warehouses in Illinois and California.

==== Robotics ====
Hillman acquired the MinuteKey robotic key cutting kiosk manufacturer in 2018, and continues to operate the robotics division separately.

==== Wearable products ====
In October 2018 Hillman announced the acquisition of Big Time Products, an Atlanta, Georgia-based manufacturer of gloves and carrying products sold under the brands Firm Grip, AWP, McGuire-Nicholas, Grease Monkey, and Gorilla Grip.

==== Ornamental connectors ====
In 2021 Hillman acquired OZCO Building Products, a Garland, Texas based manufacturer of ornamental connectors intended for outdoor pergolas, fences and similar applications.
