= Biosecure Act =

Bill of the 118th U.S. Congress

The Biosecure Act, or H.R. 8333, was a bill introduced during the 118th United States Congress that prohibits entities that receive federal funds from using biotechnology that is from a company associated with a U.S. foreign adversary. However, the bill was not included in the last legislation during the 118th United States Congress and as a result, it did not become law in 2024.

It became law in 2025 and in June 2026 the Department of Defense included WuXi AppTec in its list "1260H list" of “Chinese military companies” operating in the US.

== Bill summary ==
The Biosecure Act prohibits entities that receive federal funds from using biotechnology that is from a company associated with a foreign adversary.

Specifically, U.S. federal agencies and recipients of federal funds (e.g., grantees) may not procure or use any biotechnology equipment or service that is from a biotechnology company of concern and may not contract with any entities that do so. A biotechnology company of concern is defined in this bill as "an entity that is under the control of a foreign adversary and that poses a risk to national security based on its research or multiomic data collection (e.g., collection of genomic information)."

The Office of Management and Budget (OMB) must, in coordination with the Department of Defense (DOD) and other specified agencies, develop a list of prohibited companies; the list must include five particular companies, as specified in the bill. OMB and DOD may approve waivers of these restrictions on an as-needed basis, which are valid for up to one year and may be extended once for an additional 180 days.

In addition, the Office of the Director of National Intelligence must report on the national security risks posed by (1) multiomic data collection by foreign adversaries in connection with biotechnology equipment or services, and (2) biotechnology companies that have such data.

== Legislative support and activity ==
In May 2024, Representatives Brad Wenstrup and Raja Krishnamoorthy introduced H.R. 8333 in the U.S. House of Representatives. Upon introducing the legislation, the lawmakers said:

"The Chinese Communist Party’s (CCP) national security laws require all Chinese firms to share any requested data with the CCP, including biotechnology companies that collect, test, and store American genomic data. Beijing Genomics Institute (BGI), a company in the People's Republic of China (PRC), has collected DNA from millions around the world and used that data without consent on genomic projects conducted by the Chinese military. Chinese company WuXi AppTec has sponsored events with China's military, reportedly stolen U.S. IP, and jointly operated genetic collection sites with China's military."

Upon introduction, the bill was referred to the Committee on Oversight and Accountability. On May 15, 2024, the Committee advanced the bill in a 40–1 vote, demonstrating unusually high bipartisan support.

On September 9, 2024. the U.S. House passed the Biosecure Act by a vote of 306–81, well exceeding the two-thirds vote required to pass. The bill was then sent to the U.S. Senate and referred to the Committee on Homeland Security and Governmental Affairs.

In December 2024, WuXi AppTec announced that it would sell its Oxford Genetics and WuXi Advanced Therapies to a U.S.-based private equity firm, reportedly due to the Biosecure Act which is deterring potential clients.

It was re-introduced in 2025 as part of the National Defense Authorization Act for Fiscal Year 2026 and was signed into law on 18 December, 2025. In June 2026 the Department of Defense included WuXi AppTec in its list "1260H list" of “Chinese military companies” operating in the US.
