= Greg Brenneman =

American businessman (born 1961)

- Born: November 26, 1961 (age 64)
- Education: Washburn University; Harvard Business School
- Occupation: Businessman
- Spouse: Ronda Brenneman
- Children: 3

Gregory D. Brenneman (born November 26, 1961) is an American businessman. He serves as the chairman of CCMP Capital, an American private equity firm.

== Early life and education ==
Brenneman was born on November 26, 1961. He was raised a Mennonite in Hesston, Kansas, and graduated from Hesston High School in 1980. His great-uncle was the inventor and businessman Lyle Yost.

Brenneman attended Washburn University, where he was inducted into the school's Sagamore Honor Society in 1982. He graduated with a Bachelor of Administration of Business in Accounting and Finance, summa cum laude, in 1984. At Washburn, he met his future wife, Ronda Brenneman, who also graduated in 1984. In 1999, he was awarded an honorary doctor of commerce from Washburn.

After Washburn, Brenneman received an M.B.A with distinction from Harvard Business School in 1988.

== Career ==
Brenneman started his career at Bain and Company, where he became one of the youngest partners in the firm's history. He left Bain to join Continental Airlines as president and chief operating officer.

Brenneman was appointed president and chief executive officer of PwC Consulting in June 2002. His initial plan was to lead the separation of PwCs consulting business from its accounting & audit operations to avoid potential conflicts of interest where it serves as both the financial auditor and the consultant for a single company. However, IPO plans were quickly scrapped after an offer from IBM for $3.5B was received. The IBM PwC Consulting deal closed in October 2002. Brenneman remained with the company during a brief transitional period before returning to a private equity firm he founded in 1994, TurnWorks.

From August 2004 through April 2006, Brenneman was the chief executive officer of the Burger King corporation, directing the company's turnaround efforts. He replaced Brad Blum in that role on August 31, 2004. He subsequently served as the president and CEO of CCMP-owned Quiznos Sub, a fast-food sandwich chain. Reuters said he was hired by Quiznos in Jan. 2007 as a "turnaround expert" due to his work with Burger King and Continental Airlines.

Brenneman is the chairman of CCMP Capital, an American private equity firm. He serves on the board of directors of The Home Depot, Inc., Baylor College of Medicine and Automatic Data Processing.

In August 2021, he purchased Porta'Vino restaurants in Houston.

== Philanthropy ==
In 2025, Washburn University announced that it had received a $50 million investments from Ronda and Greg Brenneman. The couple's gift will rename the business school, the Gregory D. and Ronda K. Brenneman School of Business, and the nursing school, the Harmony J. Hines School of Nursing, in honor of Ronda's sister, a 1987 Washburn Nursing graduate who died from cancer in 2018.

== Honors and awards ==
In 2012, Brenneman was inducted into the Kansas Business Hall of Fame.

== Personal ==
Brenneman lives in The Woodlands, Texas.
