= Mary Godfrey =

African-American artist and educator

Mary E. Godfrey
- Born: July 3, 1913; Charlotte Court House, VA, USA
- Died: April 30, 2007 (aged 93); State College, PA, USA
- Occupation: Art educator

Mary Emmeline Godfrey (3 July 1913 - 30 April 2007) was an artist and art educator who became the first full-time African-American faculty member at Penn State University. She was hired in 1957 and served as an assistant professor of art education until her retirement in 1979.

Godfrey earned a bachelor of fine arts degree from the Pratt Institute and a master's degree from Columbia University, and worked as the assistant state supervisor of art education for the Virginia Department of Education. In 1957, Dr. Viktor Lowenfeld, head of the newly-formed Department of Art Education, College of Education, at The Pennsylvania State University, hired Godfrey as assistant professor of art education.

She held this post for 22 years, teaching courses in elementary and secondary art education, supervision, the history of art education, and introduction to crafts. She researched the design of art classrooms, studying Pennsylvania art education laboratories, art rooms, and facilities for junior high schools. Her artwork was exhibited in both Pennsylvania and Virginia.

== Early life ==
Mary Godfrey was born on July 3, 1913, in the small southern town of Charlotte Court House, Virginia, and was one of eight children of Henry B. Godfrey and Louise (née Reid) Godfrey. One of her sisters, Ruth Godfrey Gibson, was a skilled quilter and needleworker. During an interview Godfrey states she was born in Charlotte Court House, Virginia. Godfrey's family had a farm in Charlotte Court House and a house in New York City, where her father had a business.

Godfrey's older sister, Cleveland community activist and journalist, Stella Godfrey White Bigham, whose work promoted interracial understanding, was the first African American woman to sit on the Cleveland Transit System board.

== Education ==
Godfrey entered the Pratt Institute Department of Teacher Training in Art Education in 1933, at the age of 20, and received a teaching certificate in 1937. Even though records indicate Godfrey received a BFA in art education, Pratt did not grant four-year bachelor's degrees until 1938. The coursework Godfrey received during her four years was equivalent to a bachelor's degree. She was qualified to teach all phases of art in public and private school from elementary to the college level in any state.

Godfrey continued her education and received a master's degree in Art Education from Columbia University Teachers College in 1947.

== Career ==
After graduating from Pratt Institute, Godfrey was an art teacher/supervisor for the Camden Public Schools in Camden, New Jersey from 1938 to 1947. Sara Joyner, Virginia’s first state art supervisor and founder of the National Art Education Association (NAEA), worked toward advancing art education for all children and helped to organize a Negro Art Section of the Virginia Education Association, and in 1947, she hired Godfrey as the first African American assistant supervisor of Art Education in Virginia. Her job was to supervise the Black schools in the state and to promote art education. The Sisters Godfrey Collection showcases the works of artist and art educator, Mary E. Godfrey, and quilter and needleworker, Ruth Godfrey Gibson. Mary retired in 1979 after 22 years of service to The Pennsylvania State University. The College of Arts and Architecture established a scholarship in her honor to support diversity across the institution.

== Works ==
Two pieces of Godfrey's work, Art Lesson, oil on canvas, and Lady with Cat, watercolor, ink, and chalk on paper, were given by Godfrey's family to the Pennsylvania State University Palmer Museum of Art. Daybreak was included in the exhibition Those Who Taught: Selected Works by Former Faculty (May 20 - August 14, 2022), and Art Lesson was exhibited in Looking at Who We Are: The Palmer at 50 (September 23 - December 18, 2022).
