= WuXi AppTec =

Chinese pharmaceutical and medical device company

- Type: Public
- Traded as: SSE: 603259; SEHK: 2359; Hang Seng Index component; CSI A50
- Industry: Contract Research Organizations; Pharmaceutical; Biopharmaceutical; Medical Devices
- Founded: 2000; 26 years ago
- Headquarters: Shanghai, China
- Key people: Ge Li
- Website: www.wuxiapptec.com

WuXi AppTec Co., Ltd. (WuXi is pronounced as Wu-shee) is a Chinese provider of contract research, development, and manufacturing, services for the pharmaceutical and life-sciences industry, headquartered in Shanghai, China. The company operates research and manufacturing facilities in Asia, North America, and Europe.

Founded in 2000 by chemist Ge Li as WuXi PharmaTech, the company expanded through acquisitions and re‑listings in 2018 after a 2015 take‑private. It produces a large part of the ingredients used in treatments for illnesses including leukemia, lymphoma, HIV, and obesity. As of 2025, the company reported around 39,000 employees and 6,000 customers. Its clients have included Jiangsu Hengrui, GlaxoSmithKline, AstraZeneca and Pfizer.

== History ==
WuXi PharmaTech was founded in December 2000 in Shanghai by organic chemist Ge Li. The company initially focused on chemistry services.

In 2007, the company launched an initial public offering in the U.S. with shares traded on the New York Stock Exchange under the symbol "WX." That year, it also opened chemistry facilities in Tianjin.

In 2008, WuXi PharmaTech acquired AppTec Laboratory Services Inc., a US-based company founded in 2001 with expertise in medical-device and biologics testing and with facilities in St. Paul, MN; Philadelphia, PA; and Atlanta, GA. In the same year, the company was renamed WuXi AppTec. WuXi AppTec opened a toxicology facility in Suzhou in 2009.

WuXi AppTec's subsidiary, WuXi STA, opened a large-scale manufacturing facility in Jinshan in 2010. The company began a biologics discovery, development, and manufacturing operation in Shanghai and Wuxi City in 2011. At the same year, WuXi AppTec acquired MedKey, a China-based clinical research company, and Abgent, a San Diego company and one of the world's largest manufacturers of antibodies for biological research and drug discovery. In 2012, WuXi AppTec opened a chemistry facility in Wuhan and a GMP biologics drug-substance facility in Wuxi City. That year WuXi AppTec also entered into a joint venture with MedImmune, the biologics arm of AstraZeneca, to co-develop MEDI5117, an anti-IL6 antibody for rheumatoid arthritis for the Chinese market. In 2013, WuXi AppTec formed a joint venture with the global clinical contract research organization PRA International (now called PRA Health Sciences) to build a clinical research business in China.

In 2014, WuXi AppTec opened a new biologics biosafety testing facility in Suzhou. In the same year, WuXi AppTec acquired XenoBiotic Laboratories, Inc. (XBL), a contract research organization with 27 years of operation that provides bioanalytical, drug metabolism, and pharmacokinetic services to the pharmaceutical, animal health, and agrochemical industries.

In 2015, WuXi AppTec and other Chinese firms delisted their stocks from U.S. exchanges in a bid to obtain higher valuations closer to home. WuXi AppTec completed its merger with WuXi Merger Limited, a wholly owned subsidiary of New WuXi Life Science Limited. As a result of the merger, New WuXi Life Science Limited acquired the company in a cash transaction valued at approximately US$3.3 billion. In 2016, WuXi STA opened a new campus in Changzhou and operations in San Diego. In the same year, WuXi AppTec acquired Crelux GmbH, a structure-based drug discovery provider based in Munich, Germany. In 2017, WuXi AppTec acquired HD Biosciences (HDB), a biology focused preclinical drug discovery contract research organization (CRO).

In 2015, the company launched the subsidiary WuXi NextCODE following the acquisition of NextCODE Health, a bioinformatics startup company which emerged from the Icelandic firm deCODE genetics in 2013. Later, in 2019, WuXi NextCODE separated from WuXi AppTec in response to new regulations in China, and became Genuity Science. This company was then acquired by the New York biotech firm HiberCell in August 2021.

In 2017, WuXi AppTec's biologics division, WuXi Biologics, was spun off and listed on the Hong Kong Stock Exchange. In 2018, WuXi AppTec itself completed an initial public offering in Shanghai, raising over $900 million, and then subsequently listed shares in Hong Kong for an initial valuation of $1 billion.

In 2019, WuXi AppTec acquired Pharmapace, a U.S.-based biometrics and clinical data company.

In 2020, WuXi STA opened a new oligonucleotide API plant in Changzhou. The next year, the subsidiary acquired a tablet and capsule manufacturing plant in Switzerland from Bristol Myers Squibb.

In 2021, WuXi AppTec acquired Oxgene, a UK-based cell and gene therapy firm. In 2022, the firm announced plans to develop a manufacturing site in Middletown, Delaware, as well as a $1.4 billion facility expansion in Singapore. The company also opened a high-potency API facility in Jiangsu, China.

In January 2024, WuXi AppTec's share price fell on news that the United States Congress had introduced legislation called the Biosecure Act to block any federal government contracts with the company due to national security concerns. The concerns stem from allegations, denied by the company, that it has worked closely with the People's Liberation Army (PLA) as a part of the Chinese Communist Party (CCP)'s military-civil fusion strategy. On February 12, 2024, the chair and ranking member of the United States House Select Committee on Strategic Competition between the United States and the Chinese Communist Party joined Senators Gary Peters and Bill Hagerty in urging the Departments of the Treasury, Defense, and Commerce to review WuXi AppTec and WuXi Biologics for sanctions and to consider adding them to U.S. control lists. WuXi AppTec denied any affiliation with the CCP and PLA and launched a lobbying campaign in the US in response. On March 28, 2024, Reuters reported—citing two sources familiar with a classified briefing led by U.S. intelligence and diplomatic officials—that WuXi AppTec had transferred a U.S. client's intellectual property to Chinese authorities without consent; WuXi AppTec denied any unauthorized transfers and said it complies with U.S. law.

In October 2024, WuXi AppTec was reportedly considering selling its facilities in the U.S. and Europe due to the Biosecure Act, which has been discouraging potential clients. In December 2024, WuXi AppTec announced that it would sell its Oxford Genetics (Oxgene) and WuXi Advanced Therapies to a U.S.-based private equity firm. In January 2025, the company divested its U.S. medical device testing operations, with locations in Minnesota and Georgia, to the medical device contract research organization NAMSA. In October 2025, the United States Department of Defense stated that WuXi AppTec merits inclusion on a list of companies linked to China's military.

The Biosecure Act failed in the 2024 session of Congress, but was re-introduced in 2025 as part of the National Defense Authorization Act for Fiscal Year 2026, and was signed into law on 18 December, 2025. In June 2026 the Department of Defense included WuXi AppTec in its list "1260H list" of “Chinese military companies” operating in the US. In November 2026 the Department of Defense removed the company from the list again.

=== Operations ===
WuXi AppTec provides a range of services, including drug discovery, development, and manufacturing for small molecules, peptides and more. As of 2025, the company reported around 39,000 employees and 6,000 customers. WuXi AppTec's global network includes 20 sites, with major hubs in China, the United States, Germany, Switzerland, and Singapore. Clients have included Chinese drugmakers like Jiangsu Hengrui, along with American and European firms like GlaxoSmithKline, AstraZeneca and Pfizer.

WuXi Apptec is listed on the Shanghai Stock Exchange and the Hong Kong Stock Exchange, and is a component of the Hang Seng Index.
