= Windtree Therapeutics =

- Formerly: Discovery Laboratories Inc
- Company type: Public
- Traded as: Nasdaq: WINT
- Industry: Healthcare – biotechnology
- Founded: 1992
- Headquarters: Warrington, Pennsylvania, United States
- Key people: John G. Cooper (Chief Executive Officer, President, Chief Financial Officer, and Director) Thomas F. Miller Ph.D. (Chief Operating Officer) Mr. John A. Tattory (Chief Accounting Officer) (Dec 31, 2012)
- Services: Respiratory critical care
- Revenue: $ 510.00K (Sep 30, 2013)
- Number of employees: 119 (Sep 30, 2013)
- Website: windtreetx.com

Windtree Therapeutics, Inc. (formerly Discovery Laboratories) is an American company which was set up in 1992 and now is based in Warrington, Pennsylvania, developing drug products (pulmonary medicine) for patients with respiratory disease. The company joined an alliance with Laboratorios del Dr. Esteve, S.A. In 2016, Discovery Laboratories changed name to Windtree Therapeutics, Inc.

== Products and services ==
The major products of the company are Surfaxin (based on its capillary aerosol-generating technology) and Aerosurf. Surfaxin is a synthetic, peptide-containing (KL4) surfactant, similar to pulmonary surfactant, which is naturally in the lung for normal respiratory function. The drug is delivered by its capillary aerosol-generating technology to the lung. Aerosurf is a drug-device combination to prevent respiratory distress syndrome (RDS) in premature infants. In addition, the company also provides Afectair devices (disposable aerosol-conducting airway connectors).

== Research and development ==
In November 2013, Discovery Laboratories began its phase II clinical program of aerosolized KL4 since U.S. Food and Drug Administration (FDA) had cleared the investigational new drug (IND) application. The phase II consists of two steps to evaluate the safety and tolerability of the drug and determine the optimal dose for premature infants with respiratory distress syndrome (RDS)

In October 2013, Discovery Laboratories received the agreement of updating Surfaxin (lucinactant) Intratracheal Suspension from the U.S. Food and Drug Administration (FDA) to prevent respiratory distress syndrome (RDS) in premature infants.

In September 2012, Discovery Laboratories started the four research projects to explore the KL4 surfactant technology for acute lung injury (ALI). These projects are funded through government-sponsored, biodefense-related initiatives under the Project Bioshield Act of 2004 and the Pandemic and All-Hazards Preparedness Act of 2006.
