= Icon plc =

Irish pharmaceutical company

ICON plc
- Type: Public
- Traded as: Nasdaq: ICLR
- Industry: Contract research organization; Pharmaceutical; Medical device; Life sciences; Consulting
- Founded: 1990; 36 years ago in Dublin, Ireland
- Founders: John Climax; Ronan Lambe
- Headquarters: Dublin, Ireland
- Key people: Barry Balfe (CEO); Nigel Clerkin (CFO)
- Products: Services for pharmaceutical, biotech and medical device industries
- Revenue: ▲US$8.28 billion (2024)
- Net income: ▲US$705.05 million (2024)
- Total assets: ▼US$16.88 billion (2024)
- Number of employees: 40,100 (2025)
- Website: www.iconplc.com

Icon plc (stylized as "ICON") is an Irish-headquartered multinational clinical research organisation (CRO). Icon conducts clinical trials on behalf of pharmaceutical and biotechnology companies and provides services related to drug development and guiding clinical trial progress.

As of December 2025 Icon had approximately 40,100 employees in 55 countries.

== Operations ==
Icon provides outsourced drug development, clinical research, and consulting services for pharmaceutical, biotechnology, medical device, and government organizations. The company supports therapies throughout the development lifecycle, from early-stage research and clinical trial design through Phase I–IV clinical trials and commercialization. Its services include clinical trial management, laboratory and imaging services, patient recruitment, data analysis, and regulatory and market access consulting across a range of therapeutic areas.

== History ==
Icon was founded in Ireland, by John Climax and Ronan Lambe in 1990. Since January 2010, Climax has held a position on the board of directors. Lambe retired from the board of directors in 2018.

Between 1991 and 1996, Icon opened offices in the United Kingdom, United States, Germany, and Japan. Two years later, Icon shares began trading on Nasdaq, providing the company with additional capital to support international expansion and acquisitions.

In 2006, Icon acquired Ovation Research Group, expanding its capabilities in health outcomes research and health economics. In 2014, Icon expanded its capabilities in adaptive clinical trial design and execution with the acquisition of Aptiv Solutions.

In 2021, Icon completed its US$12 billion acquisition of PRA Health Sciences. The transaction expanded the company's global clinical research operations and created one of the largest contract research organizations.

On September 4, 2025, Icon announced that Steve Cutler would be stepping down from his position as CEO. Barry Balfe, the company's Chief Operating Officer, was promoted to Chief Executive Officer.

== Acquisitions ==
- 2000: Icon acquired UK-based regulatory consultancy, YRCR Ltd.; Central Laboratory in New York; and bioanalytical consultancy, Pacific Research
- 2002: Icon acquired clinical research provider, BPA.
- 2003: Icon acquired Medieval, a UK-based Phase I facility, and US consulting firm, Globomax
- 2004: Icon acquired medical imaging specialist, Beacon Bioscience Inc.
- 2006: Icon acquired outcomes research and health economics specialist, Ovation Research Group
- 2007: Icon acquired European staffing group, DOCS International
- 2008: Icon acquired US phase I provider, Healthcare Discoveries and US bioanalytical lab, Prevalere Life Sciences
- 2009: Icon acquired Veeda Laboratories, a UK biomarker lab
- 2010: Icon acquired Timaq Medical Imaging Inc.
- 2011: Icon acquired Oxford Outcomes, an international health outcomes consultancy and Firecrest Clinical, a technology provider specialising in site performance and study management
- 2012: Icon acquired PriceSpective, a global value strategy consultancy and Chinese CRO, BeijingWits
- 2013: Icon acquired staffing and FSP providers, ClinForce and Assent and Akos, an EU provider of pharmacovigilance and drug safety services
- 2014: Icon acquired Aptiv Solutions, a market leader in adaptive trial design and execution
- 2015: Icon acquired MediMedia Pharma Solutions to enhance market access and scientific communications capabilities, and PMG Research Inc., an integrated network of clinical research sites in the US
- 2016: Icon acquired Clinical Research Management Inc., to extend its presence in the government-sponsored research market
- 2017: Icon acquired MAPI Group, thereby becoming the world's second-largest provider of late-phase services
- 2019: Icon acquired Symphony Clinical Research, a leading provider of at-home patient services and site-support services; MediNova, an integrated network of clinical research sites across EMEA; and MolecularMD, to enhance its laboratory offerings in molecular diagnostic testing and immunohistochemistry
- 2020: Icon acquired MedPass International, a leading European medical device CRO, regulatory and reimbursement consultancy
- 2021: Icon acquired PRA Health Sciences, a competitor offering clinical research services, for US$12 billion. Upon completion of the transaction, PRA shareholders will own approximately 34 percent of the shares of the combined company and Icon shareholders will own approximately 66 percent.

== Finances ==
Year	Revenue (in thousands USD)	Net Income (in thousands USD)	Total Assets (in thousands USD)	Employees (k)
2020	2,797,288	332,964	3,435,606	15,730
2021	5,480,826	153,185	17,387,090	38,330
2022	7,741,386	505,304	17,185,278	41,100
2023	8,120,176	612,335	16,989,863	41,100
2024	8,281,676	705,051	16,877,678	41,900
2025	8,251,340	230,363	16,088,220	40,100

== Recognition ==
In 2018, Icon won PharmaTimes Clinical Researcher of the Year. In 2021, Icon was awarded PharmaTimes Clinical Research Company of the Year, and in 2022, won Best Contract Research Organisation (FSP) at the Scrip Awards.

In 2025 Icon was recognized in Forbes World's Top Companies for Women, and in TIME World's Best Companies list. In 2026, the company was recognized by TIME's World's Best Companies in Sustainable Growth for the second consecutive year.

== See also ==
- List of companies of Ireland
