= National Defense Authorization Act for Fiscal Year 2026 =

United States federal law

- Long title: To authorize appropriations for fiscal year 2026 for military activities of the Department of Defense, for military construction, and for defense activities of the Department of Energy, to prescribe military personnel strengths for such fiscal year, and for other purposes.
- Acronyms (colloquial): NDAA

Citations
- Public law: Pub. L. 119–60 (menu; GPO has not yet published law)

Codification
- Acts repealed: Authorization for Use of Military Force Against Iraq Resolution of 1991; Authorization for Use of Military Force Against Iraq Resolution of 2002; Caesar Syria Civilian Protection Act

Legislative history
- Introduced in the House as H.R. 3838 by Mike Rogers (R–AL) on June 9, 2025; Committee consideration by House Armed Services and Senate Armed Services; Passed the House on September 10, 2025 (231 - 196); Passed the Senate on October 9, 2025 as S. 2296 (77 - 20); Agreed to by the House on December 10, 2025 as S. 1071 (312 - 112) and by the Senate on December 17, 2025 (77 - 20); Signed into law by President Donald Trump on December 18, 2025

The National Defense Authorization Act for Fiscal Year 2026 (NDAA 2026) is a United States federal law which specifies the budget, expenditures, and policies of the U.S. Department of Defense (DOD) for fiscal year 2026. The NDAA is an annual act of Congress that redefines the U.S. military budget.

== Provisions ==
Sanctions on Syria by the US were lifted with the repeal of the Caesar Syria Civilian Protection Act. The AUMF Against Iraq of 1991 and AUMF Against Iraq of 2002 were also repealed.

There are several provisions on the regulation of unmanned aircraft systems (UAS) in the US. It centralized military counter-UAS efforts under the Joint Interagency Task Force 401, which coordinates strategy, validates counter-drone systems, and oversees procurement. It directed reviews and investments to strengthen the domestic small-UAS industrial base and broadened military authority to protect additional installations. And through the SAFER SKIES Act it further extended counter-drone authority to federal and, with training and oversight, state and local law-enforcement agencies, and increased penalties for drone-related crimes.

For the fifth year in a row, Congress included provisions on unidentified flying objects (UFOs), also known as unidentified anomalous phenomena (UAP). They force retroactive and ongoing disclosure to Congress of UFO intercepts by NORAD and NORTHCOM, centralize all UFO data under AARO, and expose classification rules that have previously shielded such encounters from oversight.

The act contains a provision which requires the Selective Service System to automatically register adult males for the draft.

The act included the Biosecure Act.
