= Ge Li =

Chinese American entrepreneur and philanthropist

Gé Lǐ
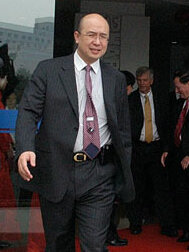
- Lǐ in 2007
- Education: Peking University (BA); Columbia University (PhD)
- Occupations: Businessman; Philanthropist
- Known for: Founder of WuXi AppTec
- Spouse: Ning Zhao (-2023)

Gé Lǐ (Chinese: 李革; pinyin: Lǐ Gé) is a Chinese-American entrepreneur and philanthropist, serving as the founder and chairman of WuXi AppTec, a contract pharmaceutical research, development and manufacturing organization (CRDMO).

== Early life and education ==
Lǐ was born in Beijing, China and graduated from the Affiliated High School of Peking University. He received his B.A. from Peking University in 1989 and a Ph.D. in organic chemistry from Columbia University in 1994. At Columbia, Lǐ's mentors included W. Clark Still and Koji Nakanishi.

== Career ==
During his employment at Pharmacopeia, Inc., Lǐ traveled to China to establish a joint business venture. Following this visit, in 2000, Lǐ left the company and co-founded WuXi AppTec in Shanghai with his wife, Ning Zhao. In 2016, WuXi AppTec opened a facility in San Diego, California, expanding its presence in the United States. The facility supports small molecule screening, discovery biology, and process research and development, as well as providing Phase I Good Manufacturing Practice (GMP) services for North American clients. The company was listed on the New York Stock Exchange before being listed on the Hong Kong Stock Exchange in 2018.

In 2011, Lǐ was selected a member of the Committee of One Hundred, a group of Chinese Americans in various fields.

As of 2022, Forbes estimated Li's net worth at $10 billion, citing the growth and valuation of WuXi AppTec. In 2020, Forbes listed him as the second-wealthiest American pharmaceutical businessperson, and in 2022, Forbes China included him among the top ten Chinese CEOs.

== Controversies and national security concerns ==
In response to proposed U.S. legislation targeting his company, Li co-signed an open letter in February 2024, rejecting what he called "blanket allegations and preemptive actions" against WuXi AppTec. The BIOSECURE Act, which passed the U.S. House of Representatives in 2024, specifically names WuXi AppTec as having ties to "a foreign adversary's military, internal security forces, or intelligence agencies." According to a detailed analysis by the Jamestown Foundation, Li has "participated intensely in CCP activities for decades" and has spoken publicly about "the central role of the Party in the WuXi Group's corporate activities as well as the role that WuXi Group plays in China achieving its national security and geostrategic science and technology objectives."

== Philanthropic activities ==
In 2018, Lǐ and Zhao donated 100 million RMB to Peking University to establish the "Li Ge-Zhao Ning Education Fund". Following this contribution, they were named honorary trustees of the university.

In 2020, the couple donated $21.5 million to Columbia University to support research and chemistry teaching. In 2021, they contributed $20 million to Memorial Sloan Kettering Cancer Center's research on lung cancer.

== Personal life and family ==
Lǐ was married to Ning Zhao, a Peking University classmate and fellow Ph.D. graduate from Columbia University, who formerly served as WuXi AppTec's senior vice president and global head of human resources. Zhao died on May 16, 2023, after a 20-year-long illness.
