= Renovo plc =

British biopharmaceutical company

Renovo Group plc
- Company type: Public limited company
- Industry: Biotechnology
- Founded: October 2000
- Defunct: May 2011; 15 years ago
- Headquarters: Manchester, United Kingdom
- Key people: Mark Ferguson (CEO)
- Number of employees: 110
- Website: Archived 24 July 2013 at the Wayback Machine

Renovo Group plc was a biopharmaceutical company founded in 1998 and headquartered in Manchester, United Kingdom. It worked in the discovery and development of drugs to reduce scarring, improve wound healing and enhance tissue regeneration. Renovo does not currently have any marketed products. It aimed "to be first to market with a scar prevention pharmaceutical drug in the US and Europe" in approximately 2014. Following the failure of its last clinical candidate, Juvista, all 100 of Renovo's staff were laid off in 2011.

Although the company stopped all pharmaceutical development, it continued as a financial provider. In August 2014, Renovo Group plc was renamed Inspired Capital plc.

== Products ==
Renovo does not currently have any marketed products. Its development pipeline currently includes one drug in phase III clinical development, two in phase II clinical development, and numerous pre-clinical candidates.

| Drug | Phase | Action |
|---|---|---|
| Juvista | Failed | Injecting into the wound margins around the time of surgery causes a prevention or reduction of scarring through the introduction of recombinant TGFβ3. |
| Adaprev | Halted | Injected at the time of surgery to prevent and reduce scarring and adhesions between the tendon and surrounding tissues following tendon repair. |
| Prevascar | Halted | Injection into the wound margins around the time of surgery reduces scarring by suppressing of TGFβ1 and TGFβ2. |
| Juvidex | | Renovo planned to partner with Juvidex as a cosmetic ingredient to improve skin appearance and to promote the healing of damaged skin. |
| RN1005 | Phase I Clinical trial | RN1005 is an advanced preclinical candidate pharmaceutical, discovered by Renovo, targeting the Wnt pathway to reduce scarring and enhance tissue regeneration. |
