= Candover Investments =

UK-based private equity firm

Candover Investments plc.
- Type: Public
- Traded as: LSE: CDI
- Industry: Private equity
- Founded: 1980; 46 years ago
- Fate: Company placed into members’ voluntary liquidation
- Headquarters: London, United Kingdom
- Key people: Richard Stone, Chairman
- Products: private equity funds
- Revenue: £41.2 million (2008)
- Operating income: £8.0 million (2008)
- Net income: £(212.6) million (2008)
- Number of employees: circa 40

Candover Investments plc. was a British-based, private equity firm, specialising in arranging and leading large buyouts and buyins. Candover Investments was structured as an investment trust. On 31 August 2010, Candover announced that it would unwind its assets and return money to shareholders and investors.

At its peak, Candover had offices in London, Paris, Madrid and Milan. Since 1980, Candover raised nine funds with total capital commitments of more than €8.7 billion.

On 19 April 2018, the Company was placed into members’ voluntary liquidation.
