= Contract research organization =

Company that is paid to provide research

In the life sciences, a contract research organization or clinical research organization (CRO) is a company that provides support to the pharmaceutical, biotechnology, and medical device industries in the form of research services outsourced on a contract basis. A CRO may provide such services as biopharmaceutical development, biological assay development, commercialization, clinical development, clinical trials management, pharmacovigilance, outcomes research, and real world evidence.

CROs are designed to reduce costs for companies developing new medicines and drugs in niche markets. They aim to simplify entry into drug markets, and simplify development, as the need for large pharmaceutical companies to do everything ‘in house’ is now redundant. CROs also support foundations, research institutions, and universities, in addition to governmental organizations (such as the NIH, EMA, etc.).

Many CROs specifically provide clinical-study and clinical-trial support for drugs and/or medical devices. However, the sponsor of the trial retains responsibility for the quality of the CRO's work. CROs range from large, international full-service organizations to small, niche specialty groups. CROs that specialize in clinical-trials services can offer their clients the expertise of moving a new drug or device from its conception to FDA/EMA marketing approval, without the drug sponsor having to maintain a staff for these services.

Organizations who have had success in working with a particular CRO in a particular context (e.g. therapeutic area) might be tempted or encouraged to expand their engagement with that CRO into other, unrelated areas; however, caution is required as CROs are always seeking to expand their experience and success in one area cannot reliably predict success in unrelated areas that might be new to the organization.

== Definition, regulatory aspects ==
The International Council on Harmonisation of Technical Requirements for Registration of Pharmaceuticals for Human Use, a 2015 Swiss NGO of pharmaceutical companies and others, defined a contract research organization (CRO), specifically pertaining to clinical trials services as: "A person or an organization (commercial, academic, or other) contracted by the sponsor to perform one or more of a sponsor's trial-related duties and functions."

It further details the sponsor's responsibilities in its good clinical practice guidelines:

- (5.2.1) A sponsor may transfer any or all of the sponsor's trial-related duties and functions to a CRO, but the ultimate responsibility for the quality and integrity of the trial data always resides with the sponsor. The CRO should implement quality assurance and quality control.
- (5.2.2) Any trial-related duty and function that is transferred to and assumed by a CRO should be specified in writing. The sponsor should ensure oversight of any trial-related duties and functions carried out on its behalf, including trial-related duties and functions that are subcontracted to another party by the sponsor's contracted CRO(s).
- (5.2.3) Any trial-related duties and functions not specifically transferred to and assumed by a CRO are retained by the sponsor.
- (5.2.4) All references to a sponsor in this guideline also apply to a CRO to the extent that a CRO has assumed the trial-related duties and functions of a sponsor.

Guidance from the US FDA published in 2013 also speaks to the responsibility of the sponsor to oversee work of the CRO, including the circumstance where risk-based monitoring has been delegated to the CRO. 2021 saw a major update to US FDA regulations related to providing the agency with information about CROs and how they "comply with FDA regulations".

== Market size and growth ==
As of 2013, there were over 1,100 CROs in the world, despite continued trends toward consolidation. Many CROs have been acquired while others have gone out of business. The industry is fragmented, with the top 10 companies controlling 56% of the market in 2008 and 55% in 2009. In 2018 global CRO market stood at $38,396.4 mln. and is projected to reach $90,926.3 mln. by the end of 2026, exhibiting a CAGR of 11.4% in the forecast period.

== Top CROs by annual revenue ==
As of 2016, there was a 15.5% increase in R&D spending from 2015 to 2020. The list of contract research organizations includes the following notable companies worldwide:

1. Labcorp ($14.00B revenue in 2020)
2. IQVIA ($11.35B revenue in 2020)
3. PPD, Inc. ($4.68B revenue in 2020)
4. Syneos Health ($4.41B revenue in 2020)
5. Charles River Laboratories ($2.92B revenue in 2020)
6. ICON PLC ($2.79B revenue in 2020)
7. Parexel ($2.44B revenue in 2017)
8. Wuxi Apptec ($1.01B revenue in 2017)
9. Medpace ($0.92B revenue in 2020)
10. BioBoston CRO

== See also ==
- List of pharmaceutical companies
- Contract manufacturing organization
- Research organization
