= WIL Research Laboratories =

Contract research organization in Ohio, US

- Type: Private
- Industry: Pharmaceutical, biotechnology, agrochemical
- Founded: 1976; 50 years ago
- Founder: G. Bruce Briggs, DVM
- Successor: Charles River Laboratories Ashland, LLC
- Headquarters: Ashland, Ohio
- Key people: Joseph F. Holson, DABFE (President [1988-2008] during sustained organic growth phase)
- Services: Toxicology; Drug metabolism; Analytical chemistry; Bioanalytical chemistry; Safety pharmacology; Pharmaceutical formulation; Regulatory affairs
- Number of employees: 1,300 (2016)

WIL Research Laboratories, LLC (acquired in 2016 and renamed Charles River Laboratories Ashland, LLC) was a contract research organization (CRO), privately held for 40 years, that provided product safety toxicological research, metabolism, bioanalytical, pharmacological, and formulation services to the pharmaceutical, biotechnology, chemical, agrochemical, and food products industries, as well as manufacturing support for clinical trials. WIL Research was well-known internationally in many disciplines, and considered by many industry experts to be the premier laboratory in the world for developmental and reproductive toxicology (DART).

== Early history ==
WIL Research Laboratories was founded in 1976 in Cincinnati, Ohio by G. Bruce Briggs, Ralph S. Hodgdon, and Robert W. Brigham, with Briggs serving as the company's first president. The company was initially a limited mammalian toxicological testing laboratory that conducted short-term studies for several clients in the Cincinnati area. In 1978, Great Lakes Chemical Corporation acquired WIL Research Laboratories. By 1980, WIL Research outgrew its facilities in Cincinnati, subsequently acquired the 75-acre Hess & Clark research facility on the outskirts of Ashland, Ohio, and by 1982 had moved its operations to the new location. The move to Ashland enabled WIL to conduct a larger number of studies as it began to expand its client base.

== History and business strategies ==
Scientist Dr. Joseph F. Holson was named president and director of WIL Research Laboratories in 1988. Over the next 20 years, WIL Research continuously expanded its scientific capabilities, facilities, and staffing levels. During this period, the company grew from a mammalian toxicology research laboratory into an interdisciplinary CRO offering services in developmental and reproductive toxicology, neurotoxicology, inhalation toxicology, developmental neurotoxicology, large animal toxicology, juvenile toxicology, safety pharmacology, metabolism, analytical and bioanalytical chemistry, and formulation to clients globally. As part of this development, the company's facilities were expanded from approximately 30,000 square feet to more than 300,000 square feet of dedicated laboratory, vivarium, and support services space. The company invested approximately $62 million into facilities renovation and expansion.

The number of employees at the company's Ashland site grew from 31 to more than 600. WIL Research placed a focus on staff training, with new biologists typically undergoing a 9–12 month training period and with all employees regularly completing continuing education, not only in their specific areas of expertise but also in the subjects of animal care and welfare, Good Laboratory Practices, and research integrity. Many of the internal training programs developed at WIL Research were highly regarded and requested by clients and industry partners.

=== Study director-centric business model ===
WIL followed a study director-centric business model, which viewed each study director as an individual business unit with scientific, project management, and marketing responsibilities. This approach was in contrast to the typical division within CROs between science and marketing. WIL Research prioritised direct scientist-to-scientist interaction as much as possible across the entire scope of each project, which gained the company numerous accolades from its clients. Examples of the types of projects undertaken by WIL Research included studies of drugs for the treatment of herpes, Alzheimers' disease, glaucoma, cancer, and AIDS, numerous pesticides, and replacement chemicals for ozone-depleting chlorofluorocarbons in fire extinguishers.

=== Global leadership in developmental and reproductive toxicology ===
WIL Research was considered by many to be the leading laboratory in the world for developmental and reproductive toxicology (DART). The DART division at WIL Research, led initially by Holson and later by Mark D. Nemec and Dr. Donald G. Stump, became known for high-quality regulatory guideline studies and for its DART research.

=== Internal innovation ===
In 1978, as a result of expanding toxicology testing services, the WIL Toxicology Data Management System (WTDMS) was developed. This protocol-driven software system was the first in the CRO industry and became the prototype for other major toxicology testing laboratories. WTDMS was licensed to several other toxicology testing laboratories, and was used continuously by WIL Research Laboratories for nearly forty years prior to its gradual replacement by the Provantis system.

=== Ashland community ===
WIL Research regularly employed personnel from the broader Ashland area, becoming one of the largest employers in the county. In a talk given to the local Rotary club, Holson stated that WIL Research at that time served approximately 550 domestic and international clients, most of whom regularly visited Ashland to monitor their studies. In 2006, WIL Research received the Golden Oak award from the mayor of Ashland, an award recognizing "the foresight, diligence and unselfishness of individuals or organizations who contribute to new growth, strengthen the roots or improve the overall community of Ashland."

WIL Research also supported Ashland University, with many of its senior scientists serving as adjunct professors in their areas of expertise, especially in the undergraduate toxicology program, which the company helped begin in 1984. Holson also served on Ashland University's science advisory board (1990–2008) and board of trustees (1993–1998), and gave the initial lecture, entitled "Risk and Regulation," of a year-long lecture series in support of the university's Environmental Studies program in 1995.

== Mergers and acquisitions ==
After nearly two decades of sustained organic growth, Joseph Holson led WIL Research through an initial period of private capital-financed expansion. In 2004, Holson and four other senior executives (Mark D. Nemec, Dr. Christopher P. Chengelis, Dr. Daniel W. Sved, and James M. Rudar) initiated a management buyout (in partnership with private equity firm Behrman Capital) from Great Lakes Chemical Corporation which led to the formation of a holding company (WRH, Inc.). The expansion continued with the merger of Biotechnics, LLC (Hillsborough, NC, led by Dr. George Parker) with WIL Research operations in Ashland, the acquisitions of Notox Beheer BV ('s-Hertogenbosch, Netherlands, let by Jan van der Hoeven, Dr. Wilbert Frieling, and Dr. Ilona Enninga) and QS Pharma LLC (Boothwyn, PA), and the subsequent $500 million sale of WRH, Inc. to American Capital, Ltd. (NASDAQ:ACAS) in 2007. After the sale to ACAS, Holson served as Vice President and Chief Scientific Officer of the global entity while continuing to serve as president and director of WIL Research Laboratories in Ashland until his retirement in November 2008. Upon Holson's retirement, Nemec was appointed President and Chief operating officer of the Ashland flagship facility, and Chengelis was named vice president and chief scientific officer.

Under the ownership of American Capital, David Spaight was named chairman and CEO of the global holding company in 2010, which undertook a re-branding and global integration effort. During the ACAS-led period, growth of the company occurred primarily through additional acquisitions, including those of Midwest BioResearch, LLC (Skokie, IL, led by Dr. Michael Schlosser) and Ricerca Bioscience's pharmaceutical services facility in Lyon, France (led by Stéphane Bulle). In addition, a new safety assessment facility in Schaijk, Netherlands (close to the existing Den Bosch site) was opened in 2015 to augment the European operations. These activities combined to increase the total number of employees in the global entity to more than 1300, with total 2015 revenues of $215 million.

In early 2016, Wilmington, MA-based Charles River Laboratories International, Inc., led by James C. Foster, acquired the global holdings of WIL Research for $585 million in cash. The platform WIL Research Laboratories facility in Ashland was subsequently renamed to Charles River Laboratories Ashland, LLC.
