= W & J Galloway & Sons =

British manufacturer of steam engines and boilers

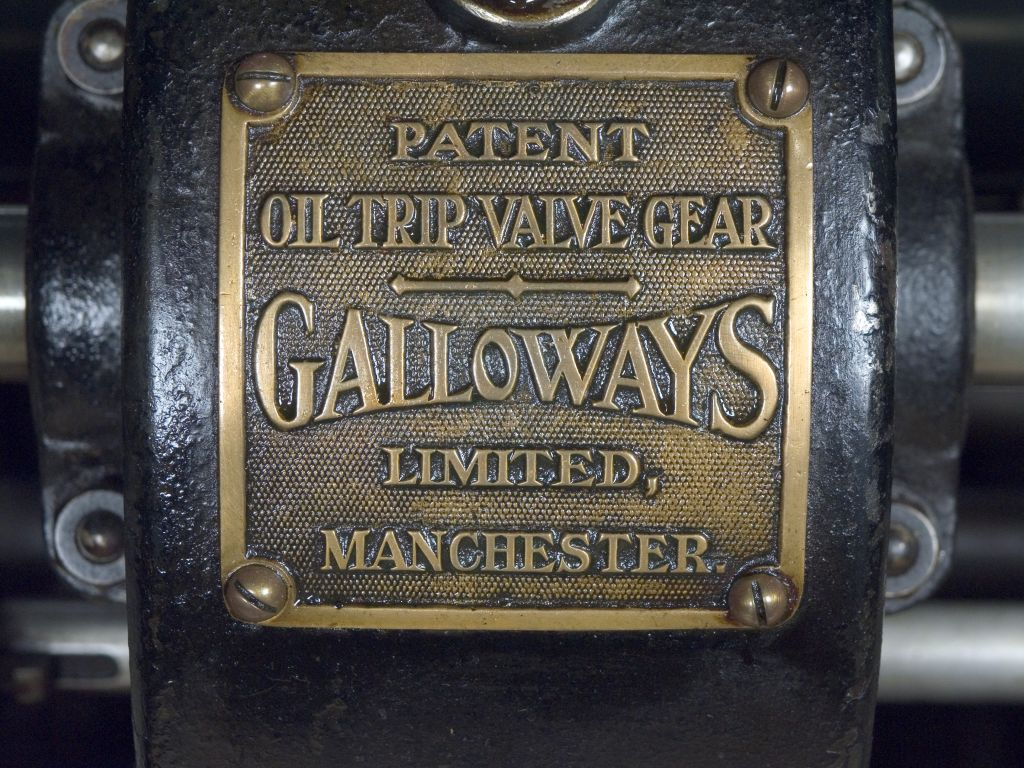
- Industry: Engineering
- Predecessor: William & John Galloway
- Founded: 1790
- Founder: William Galloway
- Defunct: 1933
- Fate: Defunct
- Successor: Hick, Hargreaves & Co. Ltd.
- Headquarters: Manchester, England
- Key people: John Galloway (Inventor)
- Products: Steam engines Boilers for steam engines

W & J Galloway and Sons was a British manufacturer of steam engines and boilers based in Manchester, England. The firm was established in 1835 as a partnership of two brothers, William and John Galloway. The partnership expanded to encompass their sons and in 1889 it was restructured as a limited liability company. It ceased trading in 1932.

The Galloway brothers had been apprenticed to another partnership involving their father, a maker of waterwheels and gearing for mills, before setting up in business on their own account. Their firm grew to be a specialist producer of steam engines and industrial boilers with a worldwide customer base and a reputation for ingenuity. Their products were used in such diverse areas as electricity generation and refrigeration. The business grew with the increasing application of steam power in industry, and it died with industry's move to the application of electric power.

== History ==
=== Galloway, Bowman and Glasgow ===
William Galloway was born on 5 March 1768 at Coldstream in the Scottish Borders, became a millwright and moved to Manchester in 1790. He was one of many Scots who moved to England seeking to gain from the rapid expansion of industry there; others included William Murdoch and James Watt, who settled in Birmingham, and fellow settlers in the Manchester area, John Kennedy, James McConnel and the cotton-spinning brothers, Adam and George Murray.

He set up business at his home address, 37 Lombard Street. In 1806 he formed a business partnership with a friend and fellow ex-resident of Coldstream, James Bowman: Galloway wrote to him offering a joint business venture in return for a £200 injection of capital. Bowman moved from London, where he had gone to seek his fortune, and took up residence at Trumpet Street, Manchester. It would appear that the partnership with Bowman coincided with a move to premises at the Caledonia Foundry at 44, Great Bridgewater Street, on the corner of Albion Street in the Gaythorn district. At this time the business traded as millwrights but by 1813 "engineers" had been added to the description, and by 1817 there was the addition of "ironfounders". The term "engineer" in relation to mechanical work was a relatively new one.

Around 1820, William Glasgow, a foundryman from the Tweed who had been working in Bolton for Rothwell and Hick, joined Galloway and Bowman as a junior partner. His role was to supervise the new ironfounding section of the business. The works were extended by the purchase of additional land. The partnership manufactured water wheels, their associated gearing, and other machinery associated with all forms of milling. As early as 1820 the men had completed some projects for customers in France (at Lille) and the United States (Charleston, South Carolina).

His son, John, wrote later that

It was rather remarkable that nearly all the original millwrights in Manchester came from the neighbourhood of the Tweed ... All were Scotchmen – quiet, respectable and mostly middle aged, with experience, for in those days a man was not put to mind one machine year after year. He had to understand pretty nearly the whole process, from taking particulars and making patterns, to fixing machinery in the mill.

At some time before 1828 Galloway and Bowman formed a partnership as machine makers. This was separate and in addition to their partnership with Glasgow, which continued to trade as millwrights, founders and engineers. It has been speculated that Bowman married a sister of Galloway.

The firm of Galloway, Bowman and Glasgow became the repair facility for the fledgling Liverpool and Manchester Railway which had no workshops of its own. In 1830–31 the partnership constructed its first steam locomotive, the Manchester and by the following year had produced the Caledonian. They had wooden wheels on to which were shrunk welded metal tyres. The wheels were built by John Ashbury, who was later to become a notable engineer in his own right and the owner of the eponymous railway wagon works at Openshaw.

Neither locomotive was initially a success, although the design problems were resolved. In the case of Caledonian the vertical cylinders were placed between the frames in front of the smokebox and drove vertically mounted connecting rods attached to the leading wheels, which were also in front of the smokebox. It had a tendency to derail and had to be rebuilt with inside cylinders and a cranked axle. Vertical cylinders were the norm at this time (other builders used them too), the theory being that a horizontal or inclined arrangement would lead to premature wear due to the weight of the piston. Four or five locomotives were built at a price fixed by the railway company of between £900 and £1000 each. John Galloway junior commented late in life that:

"... the trade did not seem likely to be remunerative, and we certainly did not foresee the immense possibilities of the railroad. It was generally considered that about 20 engines would be all that would be required, and competition was keenly felt at the beginning."

The success to come with stationary steam engines was in no small part based on the experiences with the short-lived railway locomotive production: the locomotives had boilers rated for 50 pounds per square inch (3.4 bar), compared to the normal stationary engine boiler rating at that time of 5 or 10 psi (0.34 or 0.69 bar). To put this into context, however, John Galloway senior is reported to have said that the challenges of building a locomotive were nothing compared to those of getting it out of the works and onto the railway afterwards. He elaborated that

When we had constructed the engine ... we were met with the serious difficulty of getting it down to the station. We could not put steam on, nor was there a wagon which would take it; so we had to 'bar' it down to Ordsal-lane, which took a gang of men with crowbars from six o'clock in the evening until nine o'clock the next morning.

By this time the partnership were producing a wide range of engineered items, including: wagons and associated parts for collieries and the Liverpool and Manchester Railway; machinery for silk mills and for salt works; steam engines for cotton mills; pipes for Benjamin Joule's Salford Brewery in New Bailey Street, Salford; and also a lead rolling mill.

William Galloway junior was born in 1796 and on 14 February 1804 his brother, John, was born at his father's Lombard Street address. The brothers were both apprenticed for seven years to their father from the age of 14, William as an ironfounder and John as a millwright and engineer. Bowman's son, William, was similarly apprenticed as a millwright from 1821. In the last year of his apprenticeship, 1824, John Galloway went to Dunkirk to install engines, boilers and pumps for the French government.

William Galloway senior died on 7 September 1836 and some time between April and December 1838 James Bowman also died. Glasgow had given Bowman six months' notice of his wish to terminate the partnership on 11 April 1838. In 1839 the Galloway brothers bought some of the stock of the erstwhile partnership which was being disposed of by auction. The Caledonia foundry building was subsumed by Central Station by the 1890s.

It is possible that William Glasgow was still conducting business as an ironfounder in 1841 from an address at Gloucester Street.

=== W & J Galloway ===
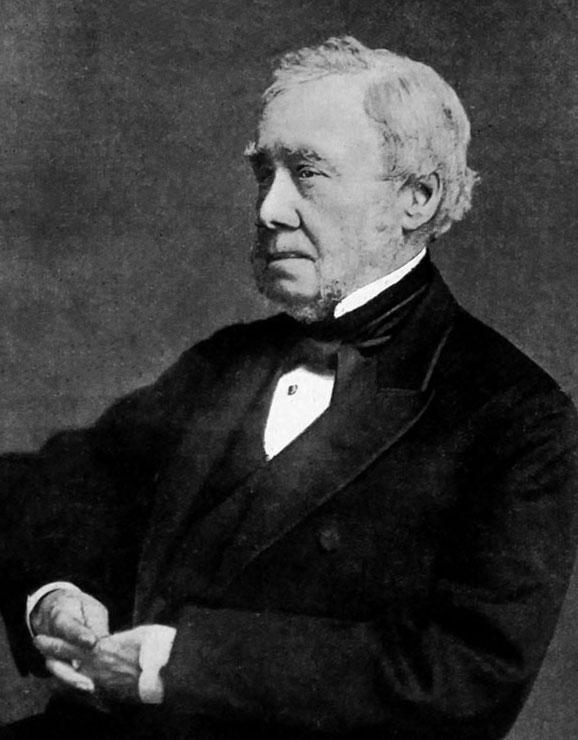
John Galloway, 1804–1894

The Galloway brothers worked for their father's partnership until in 1835, not long before its demise they set up business together as W. and J. Galloway. They had been considering such a move since at least 1830, with John saying many years later that "there were too many in partnership already, and conflicting interests began to present themselves".

The brothers built a foundry at Knott Mill, near Chester Road in Hulme on the site of former premises which had served a similar purpose but had fallen into disuse subsequent to the death of its owner, Alexander Brodie, in 1811. The site was near to William's address as known in 1832, which was 26 Jackson's Lane, Hulme. (The lane was subsequently renamed Great Jackson Street). A key advantage of the site was the adjacent River Medlock, sources of water being vital for iron founding and the operation of steam engines, and it was the erosion caused by this watercourse which required the works to be built on two levels. It has been noted that the Medlock had a greater concentration of steam engines along its length than any other similar river in England and the quality of the water was so poor, due to industrial pollution, that there were immense difficulties with priming in steam engine boilers.

Before 1840 the firm had manufactured at least two steam engines, the first for Hayward of Yeovil, Somerset and the second for a mill in Glossop, Derbyshire. In that year they were successful in gaining much work in the manufacture of gas pipes and equipment for gasworks, a new and burgeoning industry. From 1842 until June 1847 the brothers were in partnership, as Galloways & Company, with Joseph Haley, in Manchester and Paris, as "Manufacturers of Patent Screw or Lifting Jacks, and as Patentees of Machines for cutting, punching and compressing Metals, and of the Rivets and other articles constructed by the said last-mentioned Machines ... [and] as Cotton Banding Manufacturers". In that month the partnership was dissolved and the Galloways continued to manufacture the machines and rivets in Manchester and Haley continued with the rivets in Paris. By 1856 they had six of these machines in their factory and manufactured two tons of rivets per machine per day, the devices being operated by one man and 20 boys. An example of a wooden-bodied Galloway-Haley lifting jack is in Museo del Ferrocarril (railway museum) in Madrid. The patents were Haley's; for example, patent number 8768 of 31 December 1840 for an improved lifting jack and compressor.

From 1848 the brothers took out numerous patents related to steam power, with John Galloway taking a particular interest in issues to improve the efficiency of boilers. Before that they had registered at least one design to improve efficiency under the Copyright of Designs Act 1843 (6 & 7 Vict. c. 65). The most significant of the early patents was that of 11 March 1851 (England and Wales) and 14 April 1851 (Scotland) for the Galloway boiler, (UK patent 13532/1851, extended in 1865 for a further five years). They had built boilers of this type before the patent was granted, since at least 1849, and one was exhibited in 1851 at the Great Exhibition before being purchased by the West Ham Gutta Percha Company. The firm built approximately 9,000 of the type by 1891 and licensed the design for manufacture by other parties. So much work was created by this aspect of the business that in 1872 premises were obtained on Hyde Road, near Ardwick railway station, to handle it, leaving the Knott Mill works to concentrate on building engines.

The Lancashire boiler, which formed the basis on which the Galloways developed their 1851 design, had been patented by Sir William Fairbairn and John Hetherington in 1844. In 1854 Fairbairn was sent a warning letter by the firm regarding what they believed to be an infringement of their patents. Nine years previously the Galloways had done the same to James Lillie, a former business partner of Fairbairn, with reference to a boiler-related design that they alleged had been registered by them in 1845, although there is no record of any such designs or patents of the type which were registered by the Galloways between 1843 and 1845.

The Galloway boiler was not entirely the work of the brothers as they sought the advice of Robert Armstrong, a consulting engineer, in 1850 and it was he who arranged for the boiler to be exhibited in 1851. Similarly, Sekon notes that at least one Galloway patent relating to boilers was originally devised by another person: Timothy Hackworth's 1830 design for the boiler of his locomotive The Globe was later patented by the Galloways for use with stationary steam engines.

=== Working with Bessemer ===
From 1855 the firm was working with Henry Bessemer, inventor of the eponymous process, in steel manufacture; he described William Galloway as "my old friend" when writing in 1905. He had been a customer of the firm since 1843 when he had developed a process for refining sugar and employed the Galloways to construct it. Bessemer and Galloways conducted a series of experiments throughout 1855 on land bought for the purpose at the Knott Mill Ironworks. This was while he was trying to prove his method, and Galloways are thought likely to have constructed the equipment that Bessemer used in his later trials at Baxter House in London, after which he announced the process to the world in August 1856 at Cheltenham. From these events comes the claim, frequently made including by John Galloway, that the first ingots of Bessemer steel were made at the Knott Mill Ironworks. Furthermore, the Galloways were the first to license Bessemer's process, obtaining the rights to operate it in Manchester and for a radius of 10 miles (16 km) around before the process was made public. Within a month of his announcement Bessemer had raised £27,000, granting further licenses to the Dowlais Ironworks in South Wales, Govan Iron Works (Glasgow), Butterley Iron Company (Derbyshire), and a tin-plate company in Wales.

The Knott Mill works were one of those at which Bessemer set up his experimental "converting vessels" when attempting to prove his process commercially late in 1856. The other test sites were Dowlais, Butterley and Govan. The tests failed to work as intended: it later became clear that this was because the pig iron used contained phosphorus whereas that with which he had experimented in London did not. The product was "rotten hot and rotten cold", according to his friend, William Clay He refunded the licensees' money and an additional £5,500. The problem was that to remove phosphorus, a basic slag was needed, but Bessemer's sand-based refractory lining (now called acidic) reacts with it into silicates rather than the phosphorus. It would take until 1877 for a basic lining to be developed, when the converter became economical to use with phosphorus-rich iron ores.

It was a further two years before Bessemer resolved the technical metallurgical problems, at which point the Galloway ironworks were once again his test site. There he trialled the steel he had produced at his London factory, which he granulated and then transported for remelting and conversion into ingots at Sheffield:

So identical in all essential qualities was this steel with that usually employed that, during two months' trial of it, the workmen had not the slightest idea or suspicion that they were using steel made by a new process. They were accustomed to use steel of the best quality, costing £60 per ton, and they had no doubt whatever that they were still doing so.

When this success was achieved in 1858 the Galloways gave up their licensed rights, which had not been bought back as had those of the other licensees. They went instead into partnership with Bessemer, Robert Longsdon and William Daniel Allen (long-term business partners, and both of them his brothers-in-law) in building and operating his steel works in Sheffield. The business, established in 1859, was called Henry Bessemer & Co. and the capital input totalled around £12,000 with Bessemer and Longdon contributing £6,000, Allen contributing £500 and the Galloways £5,000. The partnership agreement was to be operational for 14 years. It initially produced steel at £10 to £15 cheaper per ton than had previously been possible, and later for around £45 less. The Galloways supplied equipment for its works – including tyre mills for the production of railway wheels – as well as, later, for other works which licensed the process, such as the Weardale Iron Company and John Brown of Sheffield. The venture blossomed, although Bessemer made more money from his licensing deals. He quotes the following profit/(loss) figures for the early years of the factory's trading:

Bessemer's Sheffield factory: profit / (loss) in the early years of trading (£)
1858	1859	1860	1861	1862	1863	1864	1865	1866	1867
(729)	(1,093)	923	1,475	3,685	10.968	11,827	3,949	18,076	28,622

Another involvement was in Bessemer's disastrous attempts to produce a ship with a stabilised passenger area, the SS Bessemer, for which Galloways supplied the hydraulic equipment. The concept had been that a saloon within the vessel would be supported in such a way as not to pitch, roll or yaw as the ship sailed. (The ship's manoeuvrability was poor and, having crashed on its maiden voyage, investors lost confidence and the project was abandoned with the equipment remaining untested.)

The firm manufactured on behalf of Bessemer the converters for the works of the Pennsylvania Steel Company in the late 1860s. Along with Hick, Hargreaves of Bolton, Galloways were the only business allowed to produce equipment for the new process.

Nor might these have been their only involvement: William Galloway owned land at Runcorn and there were discussions between him and Bessemer regarding a partnership to erect a blast furnace for the purpose of manufacturing "rich manganesian pig-iron", which was required at that time to de-oxidise the molten blown metal. However, delays in progressing this idea, due to Bessemer's process gaining widespread use, ultimately resulted in Galloway feeling he was too old to embark on the venture.

The partnership of Henry Bessemer & Co. was formally ended on 25 June 1877 "by the effluxion of time", although the Sheffield factory continued production with Allen buying Bessemer's interest in it that year. The dissolution of the partnership involved selling the business, its premises and its equipment. Including the distributions of profits made during its lifespan, each partner had at the date of effective dissolution in 1873 made 81 times the amount of money that they had original subscribed. William Galloway had died in 1873 (his executors being John Galloway junior, John Brown Payne and John Galloway Meller), as had Robert Longsdon, whose executors were also named in the notice of partnership dissolution; Bessemer had retired from day-to-day business in the same year. A person with the last name of Meller, but not John Galloway Meller, had been an executor to the estate of William Galloway senior.

=== W & J Galloway & Sons ===
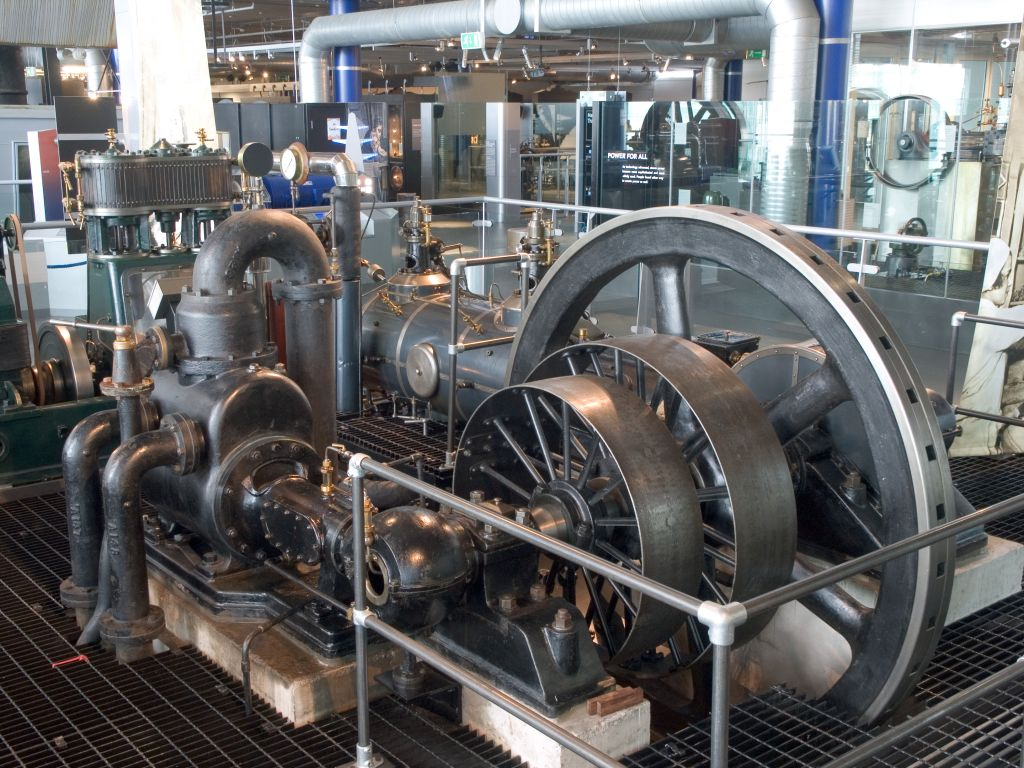
Galloway uniflow steam engine, now in Thinktank, Birmingham Science Museum

In 1856 the sons of the firm's founders joined the partnership: John Galloway, the son of William, born on 18 July 1826 at Great Jackson Street, Manchester, and Charles John the son of John, born 25 April 1833. Both had been apprenticed to the firm and its name was adjusted to reflect their involvement. Great Jackson Street was very close to the Knott Mill works and Pigot and Slater's General and Classified Directory of Manchester and Salford for 1841 not merely lists William junior living at number 69 but also John at number 55 and a Mrs Mary Galloway at 67. It also shows members of the Glasgow family, including William at 34 Great Bridgewater Street and John at 53 Great Jackson Street.

Despite the expansion of the partnership a deed registered in the Court of Bankruptcy in July 1864 only names William and John Galloway, who were to receive a payment of 6s. 8d. in the pound from Thomas Redhead of Belvoir Terrace, Old Chester Road, Tranmere, the proprietor of a steam tug. A petition for the winding-up of the Globe New Patent Iron and Steel Co, Ltd. in 1875 shows that by that date the partnership comprised John Galloway snr, John Galloway Jnr, Charles John Galloway and Edward Napier Galloway. Edward was another son of John senior, who married a Miss Lewis in 1827 and they had four sons and a daughter.

During the 1850s and 1860s the firm generated many overseas sales to countries such as Turkey, India and Russia, and for items as diverse as gunpowder mills, boilers, presses, and steam engines for use in a wide variety of applications. The firm supplied cast iron columns for buildings, constructed the pier at Southport (and then extended it, for which the tender was £3,000) and, between 1855 and 1857, a 1,535 feet (468 m) railway viaduct over the River Leven close to Ulverston. The pier and the bridge employed a new construction method devised by John Galloway, using pressurised water jets to create the holes into which the piles were later driven.

Galloways were among the well-known promoters of a new business, The Lancashire Steel Company Ltd., in 1863. The intention was that this company would develop a 10 acre site at Gorton with buildings, blast furnaces and all the necessaries of steel production by the Bessemer process, in order initially to produce 200 tons a week of steel in blocks weighing up to 10 tons. The site was adjacent to the Manchester, Sheffield and Lincolnshire Railway, for ease of transport. It was planned to eventually produce 20 ton blocks and to equip it with the most powerful tooling so that the company could supply the maritime market. Capitalisation was to be £150,000. In fact, the venture was a failure and it was wound-up in 1867.

Around 1873 the firm supplied two blowing engines to the huge Krupp steelworks at Essen, Germany. It was in this decade that the company began to install flat belt drive systems for the transfer of power from its stationary steam engines to the looms and similar machinery which they were intended to service. This technique was common in the US but rare in Britain until this time: the advantages included less noise and less wasted energy in the friction losses inherent in the previously common drive shafts and their associated gearing. Also, maintenance was simpler and cheaper, and it was a more convenient method for the arrangement of power drives such that if one part were to fail then it would not cause loss of power to all sections of a factory or mill. These systems were in turn superseded in popularity by rope drive methods.

Charles John Galloway had a particular interest in exhibitions. The firm displayed two 40 horsepower Galloway boilers at the 1873 Vienna Universal Exhibition, and a 35 horsepower compound engine. In 1876 the firm was gazetted for an award for Services to the American Executive in Machinery Department at the Philadelphia International Exhibition, and he was awarded the title of Chevalier of the Legion of Honour after the Paris Exhibition of 1878, raised to the rank of Officer after the similarly titled event of 1889. He was very active in the organisation of the Royal Manchester Jubilee Exhibition of 1887. John Galloway junior was chairman of the organising committee for the latter event. Some years later, in 1894, Galloways won the Grand Prix in the Motive & Machines section of the Antwerp International Exhibition.

Charles John did not limit his activities to that of the family firm and was chairman of Boiler Insurance and Steam Power Co. Ltd. in September 1880, when an extraordinary general meeting held in King Street, Manchester resolved to liquidate the company and sell its business and assets. He was also a director of the Manchester Ship Canal Company and had been a director of the Steam Boiler Assurance Co. Ltd.

=== Galloways Ltd. ===
The partnership was converted into a private company, Galloways Ltd., in 1889, with a share capital of £250,000 in £100 shares. The initial subscribers, who each took one share, were John Galloway, John Galloway junior, Charles John Galloway, Edward Napier Galloway, Arthur Walter Galloway, John Henry Beckwith, W E Norbury and C Rought – all but the last giving their address as the Knott Mill Ironworks. Beckwith, MIMechE, had been a frequent co-applicant with Charles John Galloway in applications for patents and provisional protection thereof: he had joined the company in his early 20s in 1864 as a draughtsman and, after a brief interlude working for another business in Buenos Aires, returned in 1867; by 1877 he was chief design engineer and he became managing director with the conversion to limited company status; he resigned as managing director in 1897 but kept his seat on the board of directors until his death one year later.

John Galloway junior had been increasingly involved in the management of the partnership as it grew rapidly but the restructuring of the partnership as a company saw Charles John Galloway installed as chairman and managing director. John Galloway junior had numerous other business interests, and was a JP (as was Charles) and had a great interest in philanthropy. His business interests included being chairman of Earle's Shipbuilding and Engineering Company at Hull, and a director of Carnforth Hematite Iron Co, (correct spelling, founded 1865) the North of England Trustee, Debenture & Assets Corporation Ltd., Hoyland & Silkstone Colliery Co. and the Blackpool Land Company. Earle's had built the SS Bessemer.

Five years later, on 11 February 1894, John Galloway senior died aged almost 90. His estate was valued at £143,117 and by this time the company had 500 employees at the Knott Mill site and a further 800 at Ardwick. His last home address was Coldstream House, Old Trafford and his executors were William Lewis Galloway (a sugar refiner, of The Lawn, Brook Lane, Timperley and sometime councillor of the County Borough of Salford), Edward Napier Galloway (Normanby, Altrincham) and John Galloway Meller (a land agent of Cooper Street, Manchester). An engineer, Edward Galloway was appointed a Land Tax Commissioner in 1899; he died on 5 October 1919 when living at Hill Rise, Leicester Road, Altrincham. The children of John Galloway established a charitable fund in memory of him and his wife, Emma, in 1895. This survived under the name of the John and Emma Galloway Memorial until October 1991, when it was amalgamated.

John Galloway junior died on 16 December 1896 at his home, The Cottage, Seymour Grove, Manchester. He left one son, William Johnson Galloway, born in 1868, who was also involved with the family firm and was at the time of his father's death the Conservative MP for Manchester South-west (his father, although keeping a low profile, was of Liberal persuasion and a member of the United Presbyterian Church). Both of these men were interred at Weaste Cemetery, Salford.

There was a capital restructuring in 1895, and in 1899 the business became a public limited company. Somewhere between these dates the chairmanship appears to have moved from Charles John Galloway to Edward Napier Galloway, according to the announcements in The London Gazette. However, The Engineer reported Charles John as chairman at the company's annual general meeting in 1901 and noted that Sir Richard Mottram was a director. Mottram was Mayor of Salford between 1894 and 1898; he held other directorships with Manchester Liners Ltd (or perhaps Manchester Linen Ltd) and Chillan Mills Co Ltd.

The 1901 meeting authorised a dividend payment of 6% and the issue of 2,746 shares at £10 each in order to aid investment in plant and extended premises for the purpose of manufacturing 'high-speed engines'. This issue of shares amounted to 20% of the then issued capital, and they were taken up by existing shareholders. In the same year the company considerably extended its Knott Mill factory, at which time a visitor noted in particular the work in progress on "several exceptionally large engines for iron and steel works" (one had a 45 ton, 24-foot diameter flywheel and a total weight of 230 tons) and also a wood treatment plant for the Northern Wood Haskinising Company (haskinising was a wood preservation technique). There were reports at this time that the company had licensed and was developing Pictet's discovery of an improved method for the production of oxygen gas, although there were suggestions that this may have been as part of a syndicate involving other Manchester businesses. The plan was for Pictet to experiment further at the Galloway works and if the outcome was successful then a new company would be formed.

The 1902 annual general meeting confirmed that the expansion was complete, voted a similar dividend and re-elected William Johnson Galloway and Charles Rought as directors; it also noted that an order for a blowing machine from Carnforth Hematite was being processed.

Charles John Galloway died on 14 March 1904. His address at the time of death was Thorneyholme, Knutsford and his executors were Arthur Walter Galloway, Henry Bessemer Galloway and William Sharp Galloway, his sons. He was interred at Mobberley Church.

The Galloway boiler was still being improved around this time. In 1902 the company introduced a superheater and in 1910 began to use another design of the same.

The company was involved in a significant court case in 1912, which went to the highest court of the land and was subsequently cited in other cases, including in the United States. In 1902 a Mr Noden, employed as a riveter, had an accident at work which resulted in the amputation of a finger. He resumed work at the company in 1903 as a caulker, which involved using a light hammer, but in 1910 was instructed to use a heavy pneumatic hammer. The vibration from this heavier hammer caused his hand to become inflamed and he sought compensation, based on his injury of 1902. A lower court awarded him this compensation but the judgment was overturned on appeal by the Law Lords, who directed that there was no evidence that the 1902 accident was a contributory cause of his injury of 1910 and that, in any event, the latter incident was not actually an accident at all and therefore there was no entitlement to compensation under the terms of the 1897 Workmen's Compensation Act.

There had been a previous judgement of some legal significance in 1900, being the matter of Statham vs Galloways Ltd. In this instance an employee had obeyed the order of a superior and as a consequence of doing so had suffered injury. The ruling was that the injured employee had stepped outside the Workmen's Compensation Act by doing something which he knew to be outside the scope of his duties but, nonetheless, obedience was also a duty and that obedience took precedence.

The company was placed in receivership on the application of its debenture holders in 1912, despite the business being "much more promising than for some time past". The cause of this was a proposal to issue prior lien debentures to the value of £50,000, a move which would dilute the position of existing debenture holders. It was reported that the company might be restructured in order to resolve this issue.

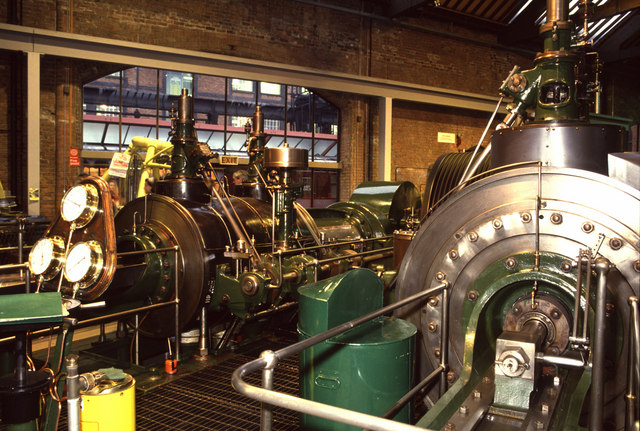
W & J Galloway 600hp cross-compound steam engine with drop-inlet valves and a uniflow low-pressure cylinder. Originally installed at Elm Street Mill, Burnley, in 1926 – the last new reciprocating steam engine supplied to a cotton mill – the engine is now preserved at the Museum of Science & Industry (MOSI) in Manchester.

There was a restructuring of the company on 27 July 1925, a scheme of arrangement being made with shareholders and debenture holders such that the capital was reduced from £330,000 to £198,192. The following year saw the company take on the drawings and patterns of John Musgrave & Sons following the closure of that business.

It has been calculated that the number of engineering firms in Manchester more than halved between 1899 and 1939, with the inter-war recession causing particularly severe contraction in the manufacturing spheres of textile machinery, locomotive engineering and boilermaking. The businesses most likely to survive were those that did not rely extensively on exports, on the production of capital goods and on time-served skilled labour – "the newer, more capital-intensive, mass-production, domestic market-oriented engineering firms, employing a large proportion of semi-skilled labour fared better and dominated the industry by 1939."

The company went into receivership in 1932 and in 1933, Hick, Hargreaves & Co. purchased the complete records, drawings and patterns of the defunct W & J Galloway Limited.

== Galloway boiler and Galloway tubes ==
In 1848, Galloways patented the Galloway tube, a tapered thermic syphon water-tube inserted in the furnace of a Lancashire boiler. The tubes are tapered, simply to make their installation through the flue easier.

These were followed in 1851 by the Galloway boiler. The flues beyond the two furnaces of the Lancashire boiler were merged into a single wide flue. This widened and flat-topped flue was stayed by the use of many conical vertical Galloway tubes being riveted into it, improving the circulation of water and increasing the heating surface.

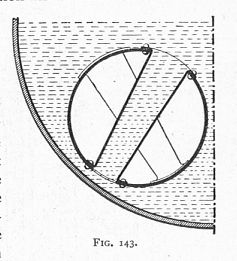
Part cross-section of a boiler showing Galloway tubes

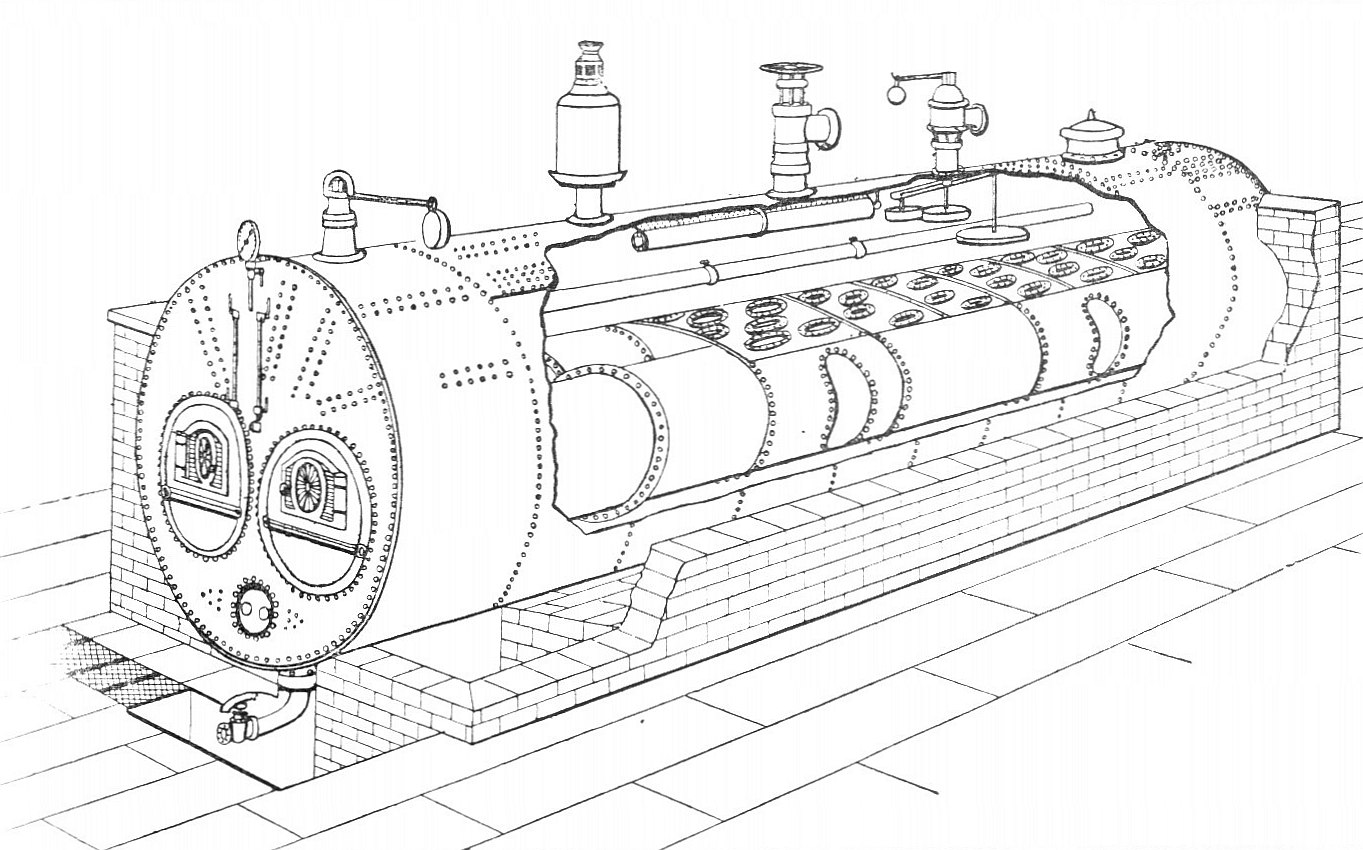
Galloway boiler, sectioned to show the inner flue

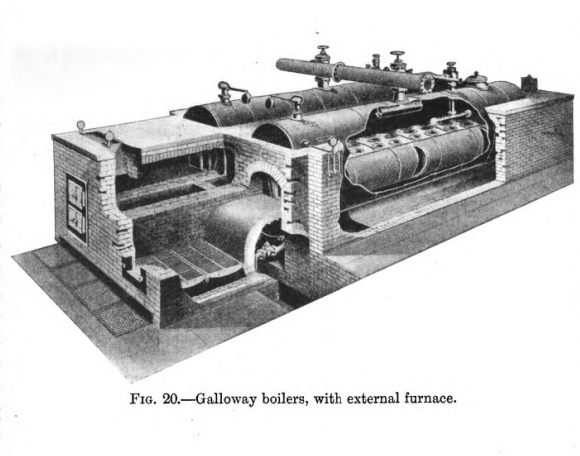
Two Galloway boilers with an external furnace

== Patent applications involving family ==
Summary of patent applications and patent provisional protection applications involving the Galloway family announced by The London Gazette and/or US Patent Office
App. No.	App. Date	For	First Named	Second Named	Voided
208	27 January 1853	improvements in steam engines and boilers	William Galloway	John Galloway	Failure to pay £50 within 3 years
570	14 March 1855	certain improvements in balancing or regulating the pressure on the slide-valves of steam-engines	William Galloway	John Galloway	Failure to pay £100 within 7 years
1132	14 May 1856	improvements in machinery for rasping, cutting and chipping dye woods	William Galloway	John Galloway	Failure to pay £50 within 3 years
1217	22 May 1856	improvements in steam boilers	William Galloway	John Galloway	Failure to pay £50 within 3 years
3083	15 December 1857	improvements in hydraulic presses	William Galloway	John Galloway	Failure to pay £50 within 3 years
801	14 April 1858	improvements in apparatus and furnaces for heating, welding, or melting metals, parts of which improvements are applicable to other furnaces	Robert Armstrong	John Galloway	
1407	22 June 1858	improvements in machinery for cutting, bruising, chipping, and rasping, and otherwise treating or preparing dye woods and roots, or other vegetable substances	William Galloway	John Galloway	Failure to pay £50 within 3 years
2960	3 December 1860	improvements in steam boilers	William Galloway	John Galloway	Failure to pay £100 within 7 years
521	1 March 1861	improvements in moulding wheels and other metal articles	William Galloway	John Galloway	
1948	6 August 1861	improvements in steam boilers and apparatus connected therewith	William Galloway	John Galloway & John William Wilson	Failure to pay £100 within 7 years
3043	12 November 1862	improvements in machinery or apparatus for cutting, shaping, punching, and compressing metals	William Galloway	John Galloway	Failure to pay £100 within 7 years
2066	20 August 1863	improvements in steam boilers and in steam and water gauges (sic) for the same	William Galloway	John Galloway	
2343	23 September 1863	improvements in lubricating journals of revolving shafts and axles, and in the apparatus employed for that purpose	William Galloway	John Galloway	Failure to pay £50 within 3 years
3110	10 December 1863	improvements in presses for the bending of metal plates into the various forms required in naval architecture, and for other purposes	William Galloway	John Galloway*	
1937	3 July 1867	improvements in the manufacture of welded tubes and in the apparatus employed for that purpose, which latter are partly applicable to other purposes	William Galloway	George Plant	
2815	7 October 1867	improvements in looms for weaving	Charles John Galloway		
591	22 February 1868	improvements in wrought iron and stei.'l pilus[sic], pillars, and columns	Charles John Galloway		
2221	14 July 1868	improvements in operating piston valves of steam engines	Charles John Galloway	Charles Herbert Holt	Failure to pay £50 within 3 years
2253	17 July 1868	improvements in boilers for generating steam and in apparatus connected therewith for heating the feed water	Charles John Galloway	Charles Herbert Holt	Failure to pay £100 within 7 years
1385	5 May 1869	improvements in slide valves and valve gear to piston valves for steam engines	Charles John Galloway	John Henry Beckwith	Failure to pay £50 within 3 years
247	30 January 1871	improvements in valves blowing engines, also applicable to air and other pumps	Charles John Galloway	John Henry Beckwith	Failure to pay £100 within 7 years
1620	5 May 1873	improvements in the slide valves of compound steam engines	Charles John Galloway	John Henry Beckwith	
4036	8 December 1873	improvements in steam boilers	Charles John Galloway	John Henry Beckwith	
2514	13 July 1875	improvements in steam boilers	Charles John Galloway	Charles Herbert Holt	Probably US 180863
2881	14 August 1875	improvements to the apparatus for the manufacture and fixing of taper and flanged tubes for boilers	Charles John Galloway	John Henry Beckwith	
158	14 January 1876	improvements in steam boilers	Charles John Galloway		US 253365
2439	13 June 1876	improvements in the valve gear of steam and other engines	Charles John Galloway	John Henry Beckwith	
3371	5 September 1877	improvements in boiler flues	Charles John Galloway		
4617	6 December 1877	improvements in pumps for raising or forcing liquids	Charles John Galloway	John Henry Beckwith	
2410	18 June 1878	improvements in apparatus for rivetting the flanges of boiler tubes	Charles John Galloway	John Henry Beckwith	
	27 May 1879	friction-clutch	Charles John Galloway	John Henry Beckwith	US 226302
7929	22 May 1890	water-tube boiler	Charles John Galloway	John Henry Beckwith	US 442036
GB 189413362	10 July 1894	improvements in Galloway boilers	Charles John Galloway		US 537763
GB 189517425	18 September 1895	improvements in boiler furnaces	Galloways Ltd	Henry Foster	
GB 189517500	19 September 1895	improvements in Corliss valve gear for steam engines	Galloways Ltd	John Henry Beckwith	
GB 189628492	12 December 1896	improvements in apparatus for drilling and rivetting the tube flanges and flue plates of Galloway boilers	Galloways Ltd	John Henry Beckwith	
GB 189629086	18 December 1896	an improvement in shut-off valves	Galloways Ltd	John Henry Beckwith	
GB 189807005	22 March 1898	improvements in compound steam or other fluid pressure engines	Galloways Ltd	Henry Foster, Alfred Etchells	
GB 189820284	24 September 1898	an improvement in gear for working Corliss and such like valves	Galloways Ltd	Alfred Etchells	
GB 189821414	11 October 1898	an improvement in multiple flue boilers	Galloways Ltd	William Bayliss	
GB 190017470	2 October 1900	improvements in compound safety and low water valves	Galloways Ltd	William Bayliss	
GB 190017469	2 October 1900	an improvement in valve apparatus for reversing rolling mill and similar engines	Galloways Ltd	Henry Foster	
GB 190107698	15 April 1901	an improvement in centrifugal and inertia governors	Galloways Ltd	Herbert Lindley	
GB 190328035	21 December 1903	improvements in steam generators	Galloways Ltd	William Bayliss	
GB 190328034	21 December 1903	improvements in and relating to steam superheaters	Galloways Ltd	William Bayliss	
GB 191004774	25 February 1910	an improved cross-box for connecting the headers of a water tube boiler with the main steam and water drum	Galloways Ltd	Henry Pilling	
GB 191009286	16 April 1910	improvements in steam engine valve chambers	Galloways Ltd	Henry Pilling	
GB 191019348	17 August 1910	improvements in steam superheaters	Galloways Ltd	Henry Pilling	
GB 191102613	1 February 1911	improvements in controlling gear for steam driven rolling mill engines, winding engines and the like	Galloways Ltd	Henry Pilling	
GB 191107296	23 March 1911	improvements in covers for vessels containing fluid under pressure	Galloways Ltd	Henry Pilling	
GB 191409971	22 April 1914	improvements in reciprocating piston engines	Galloways Ltd	Henry Pilling	Failed to pay, voided 22 April 1923; reapplied November 1924, successful 12 February 1925
GB 103531	2 January 1916	improvements in valve gear for reciprocating steam engines	Galloways Ltd	Henry Pilling	
GB 118462	9 December 1916	improvements in cylinders for uniflow steam engines	Galloways Ltd	Henry Pilling	
GB 116799	30 July 1917	improvements relating to cylinders of uniflow steam engines	Galloways Ltd	Henry Pilling	
GB 114094	14 September 1917	an improved automatic valve	Galloways Ltd	Henry Pilling	
	27 September 1917	improvements in and relating to valves for engines	Henry Crowe		Assigned to Galloways US 1367357
GB 123147	11 February 1918	improved means for connecting the piston to the piston rod of a motive fluid engine	Galloways Ltd	Henry Pilling	
GB 127797	6 March 1919	an improved piston for gas engines	Galloways Ltd	Henry Pilling	
GB 128879	7 March 1919	improvements relating to exhaust valve boxes of internal combustion engines	Galloways Ltd	Henry Pilling	
GB 142692	12 June 1919	improvements relating to superheaters	Galloways Ltd	Henry Pilling	
GB 152863	19 October 1919	improvements in or relating to the operation of valves by fluid pressure	Galloways Ltd	Henry Pilling	
GB 151198	28 January 1920	improvements relating to pistons of uniflow steam engines	Galloways Ltd	Henry Pilling	
GB 162913	1 May 1920	improvements relating to water tube boilers	Galloways Ltd	Ralph John Smith	
GB 182159	28 February 1921	improvements in reciprocating piston engines	Galloways Ltd	Henry Pilling	
GB 184101	24 October 1921	improvements in steam superheaters	Galloways Ltd	Harold Ashton	
GB 229170	23 June 1924	improvements in balanced valves for steam or other elastic fluid engines	Galloways Ltd	Henry Pilling	
GB 235734	19 July 1924	improvements relating to steam generators	Galloways Ltd	Henry Pilling	
GB 233566	21 July 1924	improvements in apparatus for accumulating the heat of exhaust steam and for heating water	Galloways Ltd	Henry Pilling	
GB 232131	7 November 1924	improvements relating to the valve gear of steam engines	Galloways Ltd	Henry Pilling	
GB 251844	24 September 1925	improvements relating to pressure regulators	Galloways Ltd	Henry Pilling	
GB 277843	28 December 1926	improvements relating to tubular structures such as superheaters, water heaters, airheaters and the like	Galloways Ltd	Henry Pilling	
GB 276215	28 December 1926	improvements relating to boilers, superheaters, feed water heaters and the like	Galloways Ltd	Henry Pilling	
GB 312815	7 June 1928	improvements relating to tubular structures such as superheaters, water heaters, airheaters and the like	Galloways Ltd	Henry Pilling, Albert Edward Leek	Addition to 277843

== See also ==
- Manchester Hydraulic Power, an example of Galloways' steam-powered hydraulics work
- William Johnson Galloway (1868–1931), only son of John Galloway junior, was recorded as a director of the company at various dates from 1892 to 1905. His directorship may have extended before and after these years.
