= Joseph F. Holson =

American scientist and executive

- Born: Joseph Franklin Holson
- Other name: Joe Holson
- Education: East Carolina University; University of Cincinnati College of Medicine
- Scientific career
- Fields: Toxicologist
- Workplaces: National Center for Toxicological Research; WIL Research Laboratories
- Thesis: Relative Transport Roles of Chorioallantic and Yolk Sac Placentae on the 12th and 13th Days of Gestation (1974)
- Doctoral advisor: James G. Wilson

Joseph F. Holson, an American scientist, business executive, and educator in the disciplines of toxicology and product development, served as President of WIL Research Laboratories for 20 years (1988–2008). He is known for his contributions to the fields of developmental and reproductive toxicology (DART), pharmacokinetics, and risk assessment, including extensive experience with study design, data interpretation, and interspecies extrapolation of health effects data. He has served in numerous U.S. EPA/FDA advisory committees and as an expert toxicology witness. He was elected to two National Academy of Sciences toxicology committees. Dr. Holson is an editor and author of the textbook Regulatory Toxicology and an author of two significant chapters in the textbook Developmental and Reproductive Toxicology: A Practical Approach, Second Edition. Two of his peer-reviewed articles were recognized by the Risk Assessment Specialty Section of the Society of Toxicology as the Outstanding Published Papers Demonstrating an Application of Risk Assessment. He is the first author to receive this award in consecutive years for publications produced with two separate sets of coauthors.

== Education ==
Holson received his Doctorate in Physiology in 1973 from the University of Cincinnati College of Medicine, having studied under the direction of Dr. James G. Wilson in the disciplines of developmental toxicology and research pediatrics. His doctoral research investigated the relative transport capabilities of chorioallantoic and yolk sac placentae during organogenesis in the rat. Prior to his doctoral training, he earned a B.S. (1967) and M.S. (1969) in Biology from East Carolina University (receiving the Poteat Award for his research on the teratogenicity of LSD). He also completed a Traineeship in Reproductive Physiology at Louisiana State University in Baton Rouge, Louisiana, in 1970.

== Career ==
=== National Center for Toxicological Research ===
Holson began his professional career in 1973 with the U.S. FDA/EPA-sponsored National Center for Toxicological Research (NCTR) in Little Rock, Arkansas, as a reproductive toxicologist. He became the division director in 1975 and organized a multidisciplinary research program, which became one of the nation's major federally sponsored research groups in reproductive toxicology. For the next five years, he directed the teratology and developmental toxicology research programs of the National Toxicology Program (NTP), which focused on biochemical and physiological causes of birth defects, pharmacokinetics, postnatal functional evaluations, and mechanistic studies. While at NCTR, Holson also was instrumental in developing the FDA Good Laboratory Practice (GLP) regulations and organized and wrote the first FDA training program for GLP inspectors.

During his tenure at NCTR, he also served as assistant professor of physiology in the Interdisciplinary Toxicology Training Program at the University of Arkansas School of Medicine in Little Rock, Arkansas. In this capacity, he developed and taught the first graduate-level regulatory toxicology course in the country, served on PhD student committees, and was a member of the admissions committee and policy council.

=== Science Applications International Corporation ===
Holson joined Science Applications International Corporation (SAIC) in La Jolla, California during March 1980 to establish research and development and chemical testing programs in toxicology. For the next five years, he directed SAIC's toxicology division, which included an active reproductive toxicology research emphasis. In 1983, he was elected to SAIC's Executive Science and Technology Council. During his time at SAIC, he served as an adjunct lecturer in toxicology for the Toxicology Training Program at the University of Arizona and the Graduate Program in Public Health at San Diego State University.

=== Biomedical Research Institute of America ===
From 1985 through 1986, he served as president of Biomedical Research Institute of America in La Jolla, California and as an independent consultant in toxicology. From 1980-1986, he also served as a member of the board of directors and secretary for the San Diego Biomedical Research Institute.

=== WIL Research Laboratories ===
In March 1987, Holson was appointed vice president and director of developmental and reproductive toxicology at WIL Research Laboratories, Inc., in Ashland, Ohio. In August 1988, he was promoted to president and director of WIL Research. During the next 20 years, he was responsible for all fiduciary and scientific aspects of the company's operations. He remained scientifically active by serving as a study director upon special request, selectively reviewing data and reports, advising sponsors regarding toxicologic and product development issues, serving as a consultant to federal agencies, publishing scientific papers, giving presentations to various community and scientific organizations, and lecturing at Ashland University. He also served on Ashland University's science advisory board (1990–2008) and board of trustees (1993–1998), as well as Pfizer's Advisory Panel for Developmental and Reproductive Toxicology and Johnson & Johnson's Advisory Panel for Pediatric-Approved Pharmaceuticals.

Under Holson's leadership, WIL Research grew from approximately 30 employees and negative profitability into a dynamic contract research organization employing more than 600 individuals, with an 18% compound annual growth rate and nearly $40 million annual EBITDA. This success was attributed to the internationally recognized scientific prowess of WIL's staff, the company's study director-centric business model (which viewed each study director as an individual business unit with scientific, project management, and marketing responsibilities), and internally developed innovations such as the industry's first protocol-driven toxicology data management software system. Holson emphasized direct scientist-to-scientist interaction as much as possible across the entire scope of each project, which gained WIL Research numerous accolades from its clients.

After nearly two decades of sustained organic growth, Holson led WIL Research through a period of private capital-financed expansion, beginning with a management buyout (in partnership with Behrman Capital) and formation of a holding company (WRH) in 2004. The expansion continued with acquisitions in the U.S. and Europe, culminating in the $500 million sale of WRH to American Capital, Ltd. (NASDAQ:ACAS) in 2007. After the sale to ACAS, he served as vice president and chief scientific officer of the global entity while continuing to serve as president and director of WIL Research Laboratories in Ashland, Ohio until his retirement from active management duties in November 2008. He served on the board of directors of WRH from its inception in 2004 until February 2009.

== Research highlights ==
Holson's research career has spanned a diverse range of test agents using a variety of experimental animal models and human studies. Building upon the foundational principles of teratology expounded upon by his doctoral advisor, James G. Wilson, his work has emphasized comparative and holistic approaches to problem-solving in the field of developmental and reproductive toxicology. These approaches included extensive collaboration between experimental toxicologists and epidemiologists, advancements in experimental design (e.g., use of replicates and unbalanced study designs) and biostatistics (e.g., use of statistical power calculations), and robust assessments of reliability and animal-human concordance of experimental toxicity findings.

Early in Holson's career, while at NCTR, he led studies that assessed the developmental toxicity of FD&C Red No. 2, an amaranth dye, and the herbicide 2,4,5‐T (a component of Agent Orange). The FD&C Red No. 2 study was a multi-laboratory collaborative effort between industry, U.S. FDA, and NCTR, while the 2,4,5-T study was a large-scale multireplicated study in various strains/stocks of mice that included replicated test groups, at least four dose levels per replicate, use of multiple stocks/strains of animals to obtain an estimate of the range in sensitivities due to genotype, complete maternal pathology, and fetal histopathology and teratological evaluation. In a follow-up statistical analysis of these data, it was calculated that 805 litters per dose group would be necessary to detect a 5% increase in embryo resorption, suggesting that no standard regulatory study is adequately capable of evaluating the dose-response threshold at low response rates. Based on these results, Holson recommended that U.S. FDA include a similar approach to standardize the statistical resolving power of tests relative to known interlaboratory and interspecies endpoint variability and variances.

Holson was also among the first developmental toxicologists to quantitatively evaluate the "litter effect" of studies in which fetal endpoints were assessed after the maternal animal was dosed. Although litter-based statistical analyses had been conducted for body weight and survival parameters, Holson insisted that litter-based corrections should also be used for fetal malformations and variations.

Based on his early work, Holson was among the first teratology researchers to assert that the various endpoints of developmental toxicity studies (intrauterine growth retardation, malformations [birth defects], functional impairment, and death) in fact constituted a continuum of responses rather than discrete outcomes, which led him to conclude that human manifestations of teratogenicity across exposure levels were most commonly multiple outcomes. Throughout his career Holson argued consistently that developmental toxicity must be viewed holistically, not simply as a group of disparate anatomical, functional, and postnatal defects, before such data can be effectively used to derive a complete estimate of human risks.

Holson was among the first to recognize that more emphasis needed to be placed on pharmacokinetic evaluations within developmental and reproductive toxicity studies in order to quantify the internal exposure to xenobiotics. His team at NCTR conducted the first series of studies designed to assess the feasibility of using pharmacokinetics to improve the design, interpretation, and extrapolation of developmental toxicity studies, in an attempt to develop methods for predicting the magnitude of endpoints in teratology and to show how interlitter variability and inter-strain and inter-species differences could be better interpreted and accounted for based on differences in the handling of a compound. Throughout his career he emphasized the use of pharmacokinetic determinations as a necessary component of developmental, reproductive, and nonclinical juvenile toxicity studies.

Holson was also the first to apply the principle of comparative ontogeny of development (physiologic age) between organ systems in various species to the interpretation of developmental, reproductive, and pediatric toxicology data.

Throughout his career, Holson served as a key advisor to numerous product development programs (INDs, NDAs, TCSA consent orders, FIFRA registrations and international product registrations) and was the principal investigator in more than 600 safety assessment studies. In these studies he emphasized his longstanding principles of holistic evaluation of data, inclusion of pharmacokinetic endpoints where possible, robust and creative experimental designs, determination of the statistical power of the study relative to known variability in endpoints, and cognizance of comparative ontogeny of development. In addition to LSD, FD&C Red No. 2, and 2,4,5-T, he was instrumental in significant developmental, reproductive, and/or nonclinical juvenile toxicity assessments of mirex, inorganic arsenic, nelfinavir (Viracept, an antiretroviral drug used to treat AIDS), fluoxetine (Prozac), two silicon-based ingredients found in breast implants and numerous personal care products (D4 and D5), methyl iodide, and HBOC-201 (a bovine hemoglobin-based oxygen carrier).

== Retirement ==
After retiring from active duties at WIL Research, Holson focused on conservation efforts on his 90-acre farm outside Ashland, Ohio. Since 1994, when he began to plant native prairie grasses and several thousand trees, he allowed the bulk of the property to gradually return to a natural state as a conservation habitat supported by Ohio's Conservation Reserve Program, including development of a 10-acre wildflower area designated as a pollinator habitat. He also maintains 45 acres of mature hardwood forest. This overall effort has facilitated Holson's personal study of conservation and animal behavior, including various flora and fauna.

=== Felony drug and sex offender charges ===
In August 2009, Holson pled guilty to the "possession of cocaine and complicity involving the illegal use of a minor in nudity-oriented material or performance", which required him to register as a Tier I sex offender. He later unsuccessfully appealed to withdraw these pleas.
