= Joseph Moody =

Joseph Moody may refer to:

- Joseph D. Moody (1841–1909), American dentist and president of the Historical Society of Southern California
- Joe Moody (politician) (born 1981), member of the Texas House of Representatives
- Joe Moody (rugby union) (born 1988), New Zealand rugby union player
