= Ashland, Ohio =

City in Ohio, US

- City
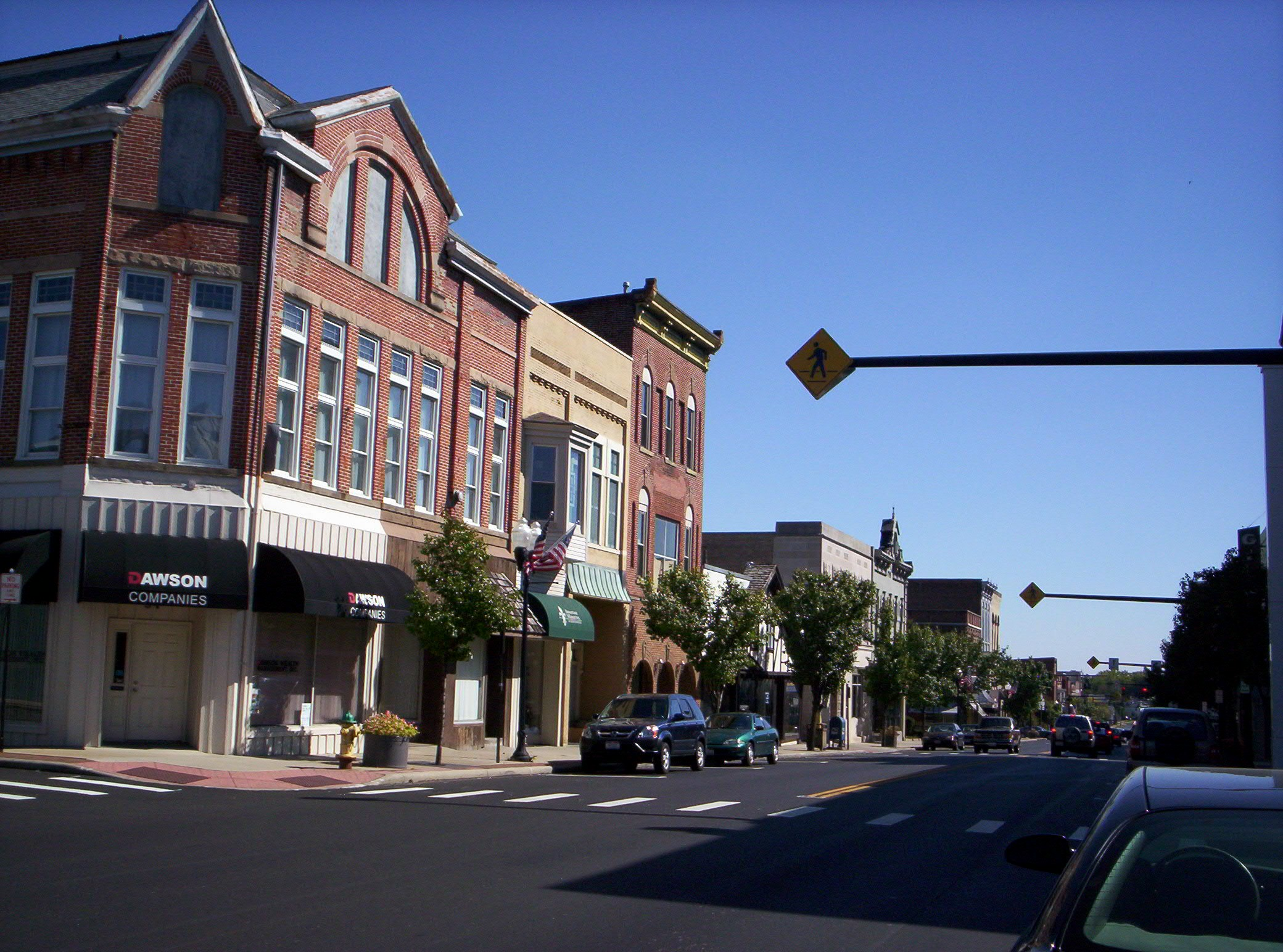
- East Main Street, downtown

- Flag Seal Logo
- Nickname: World Headquarters of Nice People
- Motto: "Someplace Special"
- Interactive map of Ashland, Ohio
- Location within Ohio Location within the United States
- Coordinates: 40°52′30″N 82°19′05″W
- Country: United States
- State: Ohio
- County: Ashland

Government
  - Mayor: Matt Miller

Area
  - Total: 11.35 sq mi (29.39 km^{2})
  - Land: 11.28 sq mi (29.22 km^{2})
  - Water: 0.062 sq mi (0.16 km^{2})
- Elevation: 1,066 ft (325 m)

Population (2020)
  - Total: 19,225
  - Estimate (2023): 18,718
  - Density: 1,703.8/sq mi (657.84/km^{2})
- Time zone: UTC-5 (Eastern (EST))
  - Summer (DST): UTC-4 (EDT)
- ZIP code: 44805
- Area codes: 419, 567
- FIPS code: 39-02568
- GNIS feature ID: 1085702
- Website: ashland-ohio.com

Ashland is a city in Ashland County, Ohio, United States, and its county seat. It is approximately 66 miles (106 km) southwest of Cleveland. The population was 19,225 at the 2020 census. It is the center of the Ashland Micropolitan statistical area, which includes all of Ashland County.

== History ==
Ashland was laid out by William Montgomery in 1815. Ashland was originally called Uniontown, but in 1822 the city was compelled to adopt a new name because another city in Ohio was already named Uniontown. The new name of Ashland was selected by supporters of the Kentucky congressman Henry Clay, from Ashland, his estate near Lexington. Later, "Henry Clay High School" was considered as a name for what is now known as Ashland High School.

In the mid-1800s, Ashland pioneers traveled to Oregon, naming a settlement after the town. In 1878, with financial assistance from the city, the German Baptist Brethren Church opened Ashland College. Ashland became an early center of manufacturing in Ohio. In 1870, brothers Francis E. Myers and Philip A. Myers went into business selling farm equipment and operating a repair shop. They secured the patent for a double-action pump that delivered water in a steady stream rather than spurts. By 1915, F.E. Myers & Bro. had 800 workers. Myers was the largest of the 47 factories in Ashland at that time. Other factories included Reliable Match Co. ("Strike Anywhere Matches"), Kauffman Mfg. Co. (manufacturer of folding chairs used in Union Army encampments), Dr. Hess & Clark (veterinary supplies and disinfectants) and T.W. Miller's Faultless Rubber Co. (rubber sundries, surgical goods and bicycle tires).

In 1912, Harry Ross Gill, an Ashland native, invented the way to make cigar-shaped balloons (until then they were only round). He started the Eagle Rubber Company in 1913 and the National Latex company in 1929. The industry that Gill developed in Ashland led to the city becoming known as "the balloon capital of the world." Ashland still celebrates its balloon heritage with its annual BalloonFest.

Ashland was designated a Tree City USA by the National Arbor Day Foundation in 1984.

== Geography ==
According to the 2010 census, the city has an area of 11.23 square miles (29.1 km^{2}), of which 11.17 square miles (28.9 km^{2}) (or 99.47%) is land and 0.06 square miles (0.16 km^{2}) (or 0.53%) is water.

The city has 85.6 miles (137.8 km) of streets, one hospital, two fire stations, one police station, and five parks.

== Demographics ==
Historical population
Census	Pop.	Note	%±
1850	1,264		—
1860	1,748		38.3%
1870	2,601		48.8%
1880	3,004		15.5%
1890	3,568		18.8%
1900	4,087		14.5%
1910	6,795		66.3%
1920	9,249		36.1%
1930	11,141		20.5%
1940	12,453		11.8%
1950	14,287		14.7%
1960	17,419		21.9%
1970	19,872		14.1%
1980	20,252		1.9%
1990	20,079		−0.9%
2000	21,249		5.8%
2010	20,362		−4.2%
2020	19,225		−5.6%
2025 (est.)	18,730		−2.6%
U.S. Decennial Census

=== 2020 census ===
As of the 2020 census, Ashland had a population of 19,225. The median age was 40.5 years. 19.7% of residents were under the age of 18 and 22.3% of residents were 65 years of age or older. For every 100 females there were 88.1 males, and for every 100 females age 18 and over there were 84.0 males age 18 and over.

99.5% of residents lived in urban areas, while 0.5% lived in rural areas.

There were 8,140 households in Ashland, of which 23.9% had children under the age of 18 living in them. Of all households, 39.1% were married-couple households, 19.4% were households with a male householder and no spouse or partner present, and 33.6% were households with a female householder and no spouse or partner present. About 37.5% of all households were made up of individuals and 17.2% had someone living alone who was 65 years of age or older.

There were 8,939 housing units, of which 8.9% were vacant. Among occupied housing units, 60.1% were owner-occupied and 39.9% were renter-occupied. The homeowner vacancy rate was 1.3% and the rental vacancy rate was 6.5%.

Racial composition as of the 2020 census
Race	Number	Percent
White	17,590	91.5%
Black or African American	279	1.5%
American Indian and Alaska Native	41	0.2%
Asian	244	1.3%
Native Hawaiian and Other Pacific Islander	19	0.1%
Some other race	135	0.7%
Two or more races	917	4.8%
Hispanic or Latino (of any race)	433	2.3%

=== 2010 census ===
As of the census of 2010, the city had 20,362 people, 8,063 households, and 4,813 families. The population density was 1,822.9 inhabitants per square mile (703.8/km^{2}). There were 8,914 housing units at an average density of 798.0 units per square mile (308.1 units/km^{2}). The city's racial makeup was 95.8% White, 1.4% African American, 0.1% Native American, 1.0% Asian, 0.1% Pacific Islander, 0.3% from other races, and 1.3% from two or more races. Hispanic or Latino of any race were 1.2% of the population.

There were 8,063 households, of which 28.2% had children under the age of 18 living with them, 43.2% were married couples living together, 12.1% had a female householder with no husband present, 4.4% had a male householder with no wife present, and 40.3% were non-families. 34.2% of all households were made up of individuals, and 15.9% had someone living alone who was 65 years of age or older. The average household size was 2.28 and the average family size was 2.91.

The city's median age was 36.1 years. 21% of the city's population was under age 18; 15.7% was from age 18 to 24; 22.5% was from age 25 to 44; 23.1% was from age 45 to 64; and 17.7% was age 65 or older. The city's gender makeup was 46.8% male and 53.2% female.

=== 2000 census ===
As of the census of 2000, the city had 21,249 people, 8,327 households, and 5,262 families. The population density was 2,051.5 inhabitants per square mile (792.1/km^{2}). There were 8,870 housing units at an average density of 856.4 units per square mile (330.7 units/km^{2}). The city's racial makeup was 96.35% White, 1.19% African American, 0.13% Native American, 1.05% Asian, 0.05% Pacific Islander, 0.32% from other races, and 0.91% from two or more races. Hispanic or Latino of any race were 0.85% of the population.

There were 8,327 households, of which 29.1% had children under the age of 18 living with them, 48.3% were married couples living together, 11.4% had a female householder with no husband present, and 36.8% were non-families. 31.8% of all households were made up of individuals, and 13.8% had someone living alone who was 65 years of age or older. The average household size was 2.32 and the average family size was 2.92.

22.6% of the city's population was under age 18, 15.4% was from age 18 to 24, 25.1% was from age 25 to 44, 20.3% was from age 45 to 64, and 16.6% was age 65 or older. The median age was 35 years. For every 100 females, there were 87.2 males. For every 100 females age 18 and over, there were 82.0 males.

The city's median household income was $34,250, and the median family income was $42,755. Males had a median income of $33,634 versus $21,781 for females. The city's per capita income was $16,760. About 7.9% of families and 10.5% of the population were below the poverty line, including 13.7% of those under age 18 and 9.1% of those age 65 or over.

== Parks and attractions ==
The City of Ashland Parks and Recreation Department is responsible for maintaining 360 acres of parks, playgrounds, hiking trails, and other public facilities.

== Government ==
The city is governed by a mayor, Matt Miller, and a five-person city council.

As of 2026, the mayor's salary is $106,559.00.

=== Police ===
The Ashland City Chief of Police is David Lay. The Ashland County sheriff is Kurt J. Schneider. The Chief Deputy is David Blake. The Ashland County Jail holds on average 110 inmates a day and 1750 per year.

=== Transportation ===
The Ashland County Airport is three nautical miles (3.5 mi; 5.6 km) northeast of Ashland's central business district.

== Education ==
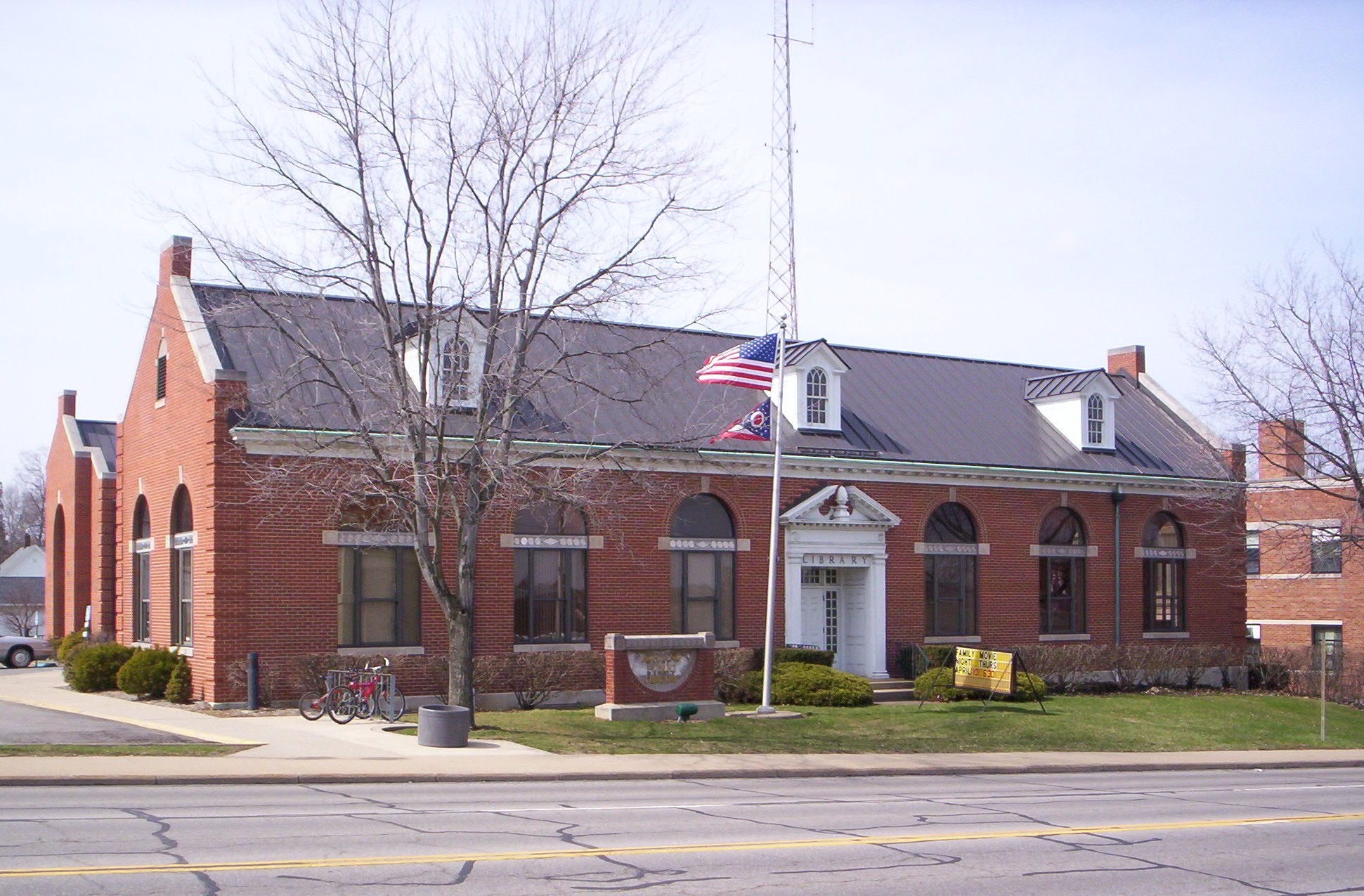
Ashland Public Library

The Ashland City School District enrolls 3,192 students in public primary and secondary schools as of the 2017–18 school year.3904350 The district operates five schools, including three elementary schools, one middle school, one high school. The Ashland City School District superintendent is Steve Paramore. The city is also home to Ashland Christian School, St. Edward Catholic School, and Ashland Montessori School.

The city is home to Ashland University and Ashland Theological Seminary. Both were established by the Brethren Church—an Evangelical Protestant church in the Anabaptist tradition—which is headquartered in Ashland.

Ashland contains the Ashland Public Library. The library provides free access to computers and wifi, reservable meeting rooms, materials, Golden Buckeye Card applications, tech coaching, voter registration, and library events. All programs held at the library are entirely free for patrons. The APL has three library vehicles; two act as bookmobiles for the community. Obtaining a library card is free and the library is now a fine free establishment.

== Notable people ==
- William B. Allison, politician who represented Iowa in the U.S. House of Representatives and U.S. Senate
- Rolla Kent Beattie, botanist
- Ernest Cline, screenwriter
- Mary Hannah Fulton, medical missionary in China
- Morris E. Gallup (1825–1893), member of the Ohio House of Representatives
- Frank John William Goldsmith, survivor of the sinking of the Titanic
- Jen Hendershott, professional bodybuilder
- Joseph F. Holson, toxicologist and President of WIL Research Laboratories
- James P. Latta, U.S. Representative from Nebraska
- Ronnie Martin, musician
- Fred Martinelli, college football head coach, member of College Football Hall of Fame
- Clara Worst Miller, Ashland College professor of Latin and writer
- Joseph D. Moody, president of the Historical Society of Southern California
- Eric Musselman, college and professional basketball team coach
- Thomas F. Olin, Chairman of Archway Cookies, Incorporated. (Named Ashland's first "Citizen of the Year" in 1991)
- Tim Richmond, NASCAR driver, Indianapolis 500 Rookie of the year
- John Roseboro, professional baseball player in Major League Baseball
- Edmund G. Ross, U.S. Senator for Kansas and Governor of the New Mexico Territory
- Tim Seder, professional football player in the National Football League (NFL)
- Jonathan Shafer, racing driver
- Todd Shafer, racing driver
- Robert C. Springer, astronaut
- John Studebaker, co-founder and later executive of the Studebaker Corporation
- Nelle Swartz, labor official and social worker
- Alfred P. Swineford, Member of the Michigan House of Representatives from 1871 to 1872
- Matt Underwood, TV play-by-play announcer for the Cleveland Guardians
- Tom Van Meter, Ohio Senate from 1973 to 1982
- Ron Zook, college football head coach; assistant coach in the NFL
