= Marilyn Spiegel =

American businessperson

- Born: Youngstown, Ohio
- Education: University of Utah (BA, MEd)

Marilyn Spiegel (née Winn) is an American businesswoman. She is currently the lead independent director of the amusement park company Six Flags. She was the president of Wynn Las Vegas and Encore, a casino-hotel resort complex on the Las Vegas Strip in Paradise, Nevada, overseeing day-to-day operations and all revenue centers at the resort from 2010 to 2013.

One of the first female leaders to run a casino resort, Spiegel oversaw multiple Caesars Entertainment properties (before that company's takeover by Eldorado Resorts) simultaneously, including Bally’s, Paris Las Vegas and Planet Hollywood, Harrah's Las Vegas, and Rio.

== Early life ==
Spiegel was born in Youngstown, Ohio to Richard Winn and Grace Purol. She graduated from high school in Salt Lake City, and received her bachelor's degree in marketing and her Master's of Education from the University of Utah.

== Gaming industry career ==
Spiegel moved to Las Vegas in 1988 and began her career in the casino industry in the position of training manager at the Holiday Casino, which was located on the current site of Harrah’s Las Vegas. In 1997, Spiegel was promoted into her first general manager role at the Harrah’s Shreveport (today Sam's Town Shreveport), in Shreveport, Louisiana. She returned to Las Vegas as senior vice president of human resources for Harrah’s Entertainment.

Spiegel was one of the first female presidents of a major casino on the Las Vegas strip, holding the position of president of Bally’s, Paris Las Vegas and Planet Hollywood as well as the President of Harrah’s Las Vegas and Rio. Spiegel was hired by Steve Wynn in 2010 to be president of Wynn Las Vegas and Encore. She retired in 2013, coming out of retirement in 2019 to retake her former role as President of Wynn Las Vegas in January 2019. This came at the request of Matthew Maddox, CEO of Wynn Las Vegas and Encore's parent company, Wynn Resorts; that year, allegations of sexual harassment toward female employees by Steve Wynn were in the news.

Spiegel plans to retire again the end of 2021.

== Other work ==
Spiegel is on the Board of Directors for the Thomas Spiegel Family Foundation. She currently serves as Secretary on the Board of Trustees of Catholic Charities of Southern Nevada, and also sits on the board of the Las Vegas Convention and Visitors Authority as part of her role with Wynn Resorts.

Spiegel joined the board of directors for the former Six Flags company on January 31, 2023. She maintained her seat in the newly formed Six Flags company following the company's merger with rival Cedar Fair in 2024. She would succeeded Six Flags executive chairman Selim Bassoul, becoming non-executive chairwoman on January 1, 2026. On March 25, 2026, she became a lead independent director for the company, with Richard Hadrill becoming an executive chairman, following pressure from activist investor Jana Partners.

Spiegel is the author of Fashion Merchandising, published by McGraw-Hill Publishing Company, and Apparel and Accessories (ISBN 9780070409088, 9780070409088).

== Personal life ==
Spiegel is married to Tom Spiegel, and they live in Las Vegas.
