= James C. Foster =

American businessman

James Clifford Foster is the chairman and chief executive officer of Charles River Laboratories, Inc., an international company that works on the drug discovery and development process. Charles River Laboratories is the world's largest breeder of animals for use in laboratory experimentation.

== Early life ==
Foster received his B.A. from Lake Forest College, his J.D. from Boston University School of Law, and his S.M. degree from the Sloan Fellows program of the MIT Sloan School of Management in 1985.

== Career ==
The son of company founder Henry Foster, James joined Charles River Laboratories in 1976 as vice president of administration and general counsel. He was named president in 1991, chief executive officer in 1992, and chairman in 2000.

He was named the 2003 Forbes magazine Entrepreneur of the Year.

In 2023, Foster's total compensation from Charles River Laboratories was $14.1 million, representing a CEO-to-median worker pay ratio of 263-to-1.
