= Barry Rosenstein =

American hedge fund manager and billionaire

- Born: 1959 or 1960 (age 65–66)
- Education: Lehigh University; Wharton School of the University of Pennsylvania
- Occupation: Hedge fund manager
- Known for: Founder of JANA Partners
- Spouse: Lizanne Teitelbaum

Barry S. Rosenstein (born 1960) is an American hedge fund manager and billionaire. He is the founder and managing partner of JANA Partners LLC, an activist hedge fund firm. He made $300 million over the merger of Whole Foods with Amazon in April–July 2017.

== Early life and education ==
Barry Rosenstein was born in 1960. He is the son of Herbert Rosenstein of West Orange, New Jersey, a senior partner in the tax accounting firm of Rosenstein, Schantz & Jacobson, and his wife, Harriet Wolf.

Rosenstein graduated from Lehigh University in 1981 where he studied accounting. He earned a master in business administration from the Wharton School of the University of Pennsylvania in 1984.

== Investing career ==
Rosenstein first worked in the investment banking and merger departments of Merrill Lynch & Co. Inc.

Before launching JANA Rosenstein worked with Asher Edelman, a well-known corporate raider, for 3.5 years in the 1980s.

Rosenstein founded hedge fund firm JANA Partners, in 2001, with about $35 million.

In April 2017, he made public that he and several investors owned 8.8% of Whole Foods, making them the second largest shareholders of the company after The Vanguard Group. He added that they aimed to shake up its board of directors and improve its use of technology. After Whole Foods merged with Amazon, Rosenstein sold his investment for $300 million in July 2017.

=== Activist investing ===
Through JANA Partners, Rosenstein buys large percentages of companies which he identifies as underperforming. He then has those companies make the changes he believes they need to improve the performance of the company.

== Boards ==
Rosenstein serves on the board of trustees of Brown University, the Rock and Roll Hall of Fame and 92nd Street Y.

== Personal life ==
In 1986, he married Lizanne Teitelbaum, the daughter of Dr Seymour Teitelbaum and Lilian Ostrovsky de Teitelbaum of Briarcliff Manor, New York, and Buenos Aires, with Rabbi David Kahane and Cantor Dov Kerin officiating at the Plaza Hotel in New York. In 2008, Forbes estimated his net worth at $1.3 billion.
