= Rolla Kent Beattie =

- Born: 1875; Ashland, Ohio
- Died: 1960 (aged 84–85)
- Scientific career
- Fields: Botany; plant pathology

Rolla Kent Beattie (1875–1960) was an American botanist and plant pathologist.

== Biography ==
=== Early life and education ===
Beattie was born in Ashland, Ohio, in 1875. He attended Cotner University, where he received a Bachelor of Arts degree in 1895. He also attended the University of Nebraska, where he received a Bachelor of Science degree in 1896 and a Master of Arts degree in 1898.

=== Career ===
Beattie was a teacher at high schools in Colorado and Wyoming until 1899, when he joined the Washington State College as an instructor of botany. Along with beginning his work on studying plant diseases at WSC, he studied plant life in Washington, Idaho, and the Northwest coast of the United States together with Charles Vancouver Piper. He became the department head and botanist at the Agricultural Experiment Station of the college after Piper left the position.

Beattie went on to work for the Federal Horticultural Board, the Bureau of Plant Industry at the United States Department of Agriculture, during which he was involved in the development of plant inspection procedures. He also studied chestnut blight and Dutch elm disease. After his retirement in 1945, Beattie took up studying the Pacific Northwest plant pioneer David Douglas, but was unable to finish his studies due to poor health.

Beattie died in 1960.
