= Jana Partners =

American activist investment firm

JANA Partners LLC
- Type: Private
- Industry: Investment management
- Founded: 2001; 25 years ago
- Founder: Barry Rosenstein
- Headquarters: New York City
- Website: janapartners.com

JANA Partners LLC (JANA or JANA Partners) is an investment manager specializing in event-driven investing. It was founded in 2001 by Barry Rosenstein. JANA engages in traditional shareholder activism and socially responsible investing.

== History ==
In the 1980s Barry Rosenstein worked with Asher Edelman. In 2001 Rosenstein founded JANA Partners. He began the firm in 2001 with $35 million, making it into a shareholder watchdog.

== Investment strategies ==
=== Activist investing ===
As an activist investor JANA Partners buys large numbers of shares in companies that it believes are underperforming, and then encourages the companies to make the changes JANA believes are needed to improve performance. The hedge fund has made activist investments in Apple Inc., Tiffany's, Whole Foods, ConAgra, PetSmart, Walgreens Boots Alliance, Apache, URS, Safeway, Ashland, Marathon Petroleum, McGraw Hill, CNET, and Kerr-McGee.

In July 2014, JANA announced a 10% share in Petsmart, despite the company's poor prospects at the time. The hedge fund pushed Petsmart towards a sale, and the company was bought in December for $8.7 billion by a group of buyers led by BC Partners.

The firm has been highly involved in the food sector. In 2015, it revealed a 7.2% stake in ConAgra and moved to change its board. In July, it successfully appointed former Nestle USA CEO Brad Alford and former Walgreens executive Timothy McLevish to the board.

In 2017, JANA Partners revealed an 8.8% stake in Whole Foods and stated intentions to make changes to the board of directors as well as improve the company's use of technology. Later that year, the fund sold its 26 million shares for a profit of approximately $300 million, following the grocer's buyout by Amazon.

In early 2017 JANA reported in its SEC 13D an agreement with Tiffany & Co. to appoint three new directors; Francesco Trapani, Roger Farah, and James Lillie.

A year later the firm announced a 9.1% stake in Pinnacle Foods Inc., as well as plans to alter the company's cost structure, operations and board of directors. Company shares rose almost 8% as a result. As of April 2018, the firm and its partners held 9.5% of the company. In June 2018, Pinnacle Foods was acquired by Conagra Brands in an $8.1 billion deal, and JANA profited $144 million on its investment.

JANA applied pressure to Bloomin’ Brands Inc. and eventually won a seat on the board as well as the appointment of a new independent director in 2018.

In October 2024, Jana announced that it had acquired a 5% stake in American food processor Lamb Weston. Jana, working with Continental Grain, was demanding a strategic review of the Lamb Weston's operations and would be seeking seats on the company's board. A survey commissioned by Jana found that nearly half of Lamb Weston's top 50 shareholders were in favor of completely replacing the company's board of directors. In June 2025, Jana and Lamb Weston reached an agreement in which four of Jana's proposed directors were added to the company's board of directors as well as two other mutually agreed-upon directors, expanding the board from 11 to 13 members. At the time of the decision Jana's position in Lamb Weston had grown to 7%.

In October 2025, Jana announced it had acquired a 9% stake in American theme park and entertainment company Six Flags, partnering with American professional football player Travis Kelce in order to pressure Six Flags to improve its marketing and customer experiences. In March 2026, Kelce became Six Flags' brand ambassador, and later in the month, pressured the company to replace its current board chair and explore a possible sale in a memo. Six Flags replaced its current board chair Marilyn Spiegel with Richard Hadrill around a week following the memo.

=== Socially responsible investing ===
==== Think Differently About Kids ====
In January 2018, JANA Partners issued a public letter to Apple Inc. alongside the California State Teachers' Retirement System (CalSTRS) called “Think Differently About Kids.” The letter called on the company to seek out new ways to limit the effects of technology on children. Together, the two funds hold approximately $2 billion of Apple Inc. shares. In June 2018, Apple released a new iOS feature called "Screen Time" aimed at increasing awareness of potential tech addiction. As a result, JANA Partners and CalSTRS issued a second letter of support.

==== JANA Impact Capital ====
In January 2018, JANA announced a new fund called JANA Impact Capital, which was formed to expand efforts towards corporate responsibility in leading companies. The fund's co-portfolio managers are Daniel Hanson and Charles Penner, and the new advisory board includes musician Sting, his wife Trudie Styler, Sister Patricia A. Daly and Robert Eccles.
