= Caledonian (locomotive) =

Early steam locomotive

28 Caledonian
Type and origin
- Power type: Steam
- Designer: Galloway
- Build date: 1832
Specifications
- Configuration
  - Whyte: 0-4-0
- Gauge: 4 ft 8 1/2 in (1,435 mm)
- Cylinders: 2
Career
- Operators: Liverpool and Manchester Railway
- Retired: 1837

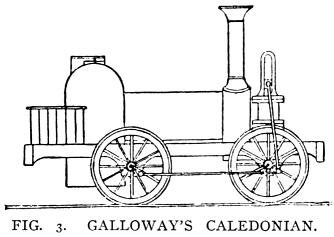

Caledonian was an early steam locomotive which had a short career on the Liverpool and Manchester Railway (L&MR).

== Design ==
Caledonian was an 0-4-0 locomotive, with two vertical cylinders mounted in the centre of the frame, driving a crankshaft. This in turn drove the wheels with outside cranks and coupling rods. It was the second locomotive built by Galloway, Bowman & Glasgow of the Caledonian Foundry in Manchester.

== History ==
Caledonian had been built speculatively and was under trial in September 1832. It was purchased by the Liverpool & Manchester Railway on 29 October 1832 for £800. The price included a spare set of wheels. It was involved in a fatal accident on the Liverpool & Manchester line on 28 February 1835. "Caledonian" was sold to the London and Birmingham Railway in 1837 for £400.

== Other locomotives ==
London, Midland and Scottish Railway Royal Scot Class 4-6-0 locomotive 6141 was originally named Caledonian. This loco was built by the North British Locomotive Company at Glasgow in September 1927 and withdrawn in April 1964 as 46141 The North Staffordshire Regiment.
