= Charles River Laboratories =

American biotechnology and pharmaceutical corporation

Charles River Laboratories International, Inc.
- Type: Public
- Traded as: NYSE: CRL; S&P 500 component
- Industry: Pharmaceuticals; Biotechnology; Gene therapy; Cell therapy; Medical devices; Contract research
- Founded: 1947; 79 years ago
- Headquarters: Wilmington, Massachusetts, U.S.
- Key people: Birgit Girshick (CEO)
- Revenue: ▼US$4.02 billion (2025)
- Operating income: ▼US$25.2 million (2025)
- Net income: ▼US$−144 million (2025)
- Total assets: ▼US$7.14 billion (2025)
- Total equity: ▼US$3.16 billion (2025)
- Number of employees: 19,700 (2025)
- Website: criver.com

Charles River Laboratories International, Incorporated is an American life sciences company and contract research organisation (CRO) headquartered in Wilmington, Massachusetts, United States. Founded in 1947, the company provides goods and services that support the development of drugs, vaccines, and other therapeutics. Its operations span at least 20 countries, offering research models, drug discovery and safety assessment, and manufacturing and testing services to pharmaceutical, biotechnology, government, and other clients.

Charles River Laboratories is a global provider of non-clinical drug development services, known for its role in toxicology studies, research animal models, and microbial testing services used in regulatory submissions to health authorities such as the U.S. Food and Drug Administration (FDA). The company has also been the subject of public scrutiny and regulatory attention over its use of research animals, including dogs, primates, and horseshoe crabs.

As of 2024, the company employs over 20,000 people worldwide and is publicly traded on the New York Stock Exchange under the ticker symbol CRL.

== History ==
Charles River was founded in 1947 by Henry Foster, a young veterinarian who purchased one thousand rat cages from a Virginia farm and set up a one-person laboratory in Boston overlooking the Charles River. He supplied local researchers with laboratory animals.

In 1955, the company's headquarters were relocated to their current home in Wilmington, Massachusetts. The organization became an international entity in 1966 by opening a new animal production facility in France.

The first commercial, comprehensive genetic monitoring program was implemented by Charles River in 1981. Three years later, they were acquired by Bausch & Lomb. In 1988, the organization began creating transgenic mice and rats. In the 1990s, they began in vitro endotoxin testing. In the 1990s, Jim Foster bought Charles River back from Bausch & Lomb, and the company later went public on the New York Stock Exchange.

Charles River launched the Humane Care Imperative in 2002, designed to raise awareness and train employees on animal welfare's importance. The same year, they were named "Company of the Year" by The Boston Globe. The company introduced preconditioning services in 2005 to provide customers with study-ready animals.

In 2008, Charles River signed a ten-year contract to partner with the National Cancer Institute and opened a facility in Frederick, Maryland.

In April 2019, Charles River announced it would cease its San Diego operations, moving the breeding of rodents for testing compounds to Hollister, California.

In March 2023, the Born Free USA animal welfare organization protested against Charles River's plan to export 1,000 endangered juvenile long-tail macaques to Cambodia for testing.

== Acquisitions ==
In 1988, Charles River purchased Specific Pathogen Antigen Free Avian Services (SPAFAS) and serologic diagnostic services Merck, Sharp, and Dohme.

Between 1996 and 2000, the company acquired Endosafe, Inc. and Sierra Biomedical.

In October 2003, Charles River Laboratories merged with Inveresk, a research company based in the United Kingdom. The company was known then as Charles River Laboratories. Inveresk specialised in clinical research and pre-clinical testing, and their main facilities are in Edinburgh, Scotland. In late 2009, Charles River sold its Clinical Services Division in Edinburgh to Quotient Bioresearch.

In 2010, Charles River Laboratories attempted to acquire WuXi PharmaTech, a China-based contract research organization, but the offer was withdrawn when the deal faced opposition from several large Charles River investors, including Relational Investors, JANA Partners, and Neuberger Berman. The proxy advisory firm RiskMetrics had also recommended that Charles River's shareholders vote against the proposed deal.

From 2008 to 2013, Charles River acquires several companies including NewLab Bioquality AG, MIR Preclinical Services, Piedmont Research Center, LLC, Cerebricon, Ltd., Accugenix, and Vital River, allowing the company to expand their research models and services portfolio to drug development and discovery markets in China.

The acquisitions of Argenta and BioFocus in 2014 allowed Charles River to establish itself as a full-service, early-stage contract research organization with integrated in vitro and in vivo capabilities from target discovery through pre-clinical development.

In July 2015, the company announced it would acquire Celsis International for $212 million.

In 2016, the company announced it was set to acquire WIL Research for approximately $585 million in cash and Blue Stream Laboratories.

In August 2017, the business announced it would acquire Brains On-Line.

In January 2018, the company announced it would acquire KWS BioTest for up to £18 million ($24.4 million). In February of the same year, Charles River announced it would acquire MPI Research for approximately $800 million in cash. The transaction was completed on April 3, 2018.

In February 2019, the company announced it would acquire Citoxlab for €448 million in cash (approximately $500 million), including the former acquisitions of the French company, AccelLAB, Atlanbio and Solvo Biotechnology. The transaction was completed on April 29. In December of the same year the business announced it would acquire HemaCare for approximately $380 million in cash.

In August 2020, the company announced it would acquire Cellero for $38 million in cash.

In January 2021, the company announced it would acquire Distributed Bio, Inc., an antibody discovery business.

In February 2021, Charles River announced it would acquire Cognate BioServices, Inc. for $875 million.

In March 2021, Charles River announced the acquisition of Retrogenix for $48 million.

In May 2021, Charles River announced the acquisition of Vigene Biosciences, a gene therapy contract development and manufacturing organization (CDMO), for $292.5 million.

In October 2021, a Japanese subsidiary of Charles River was acquired by Jackson Laboratory for $63M.

In April 2022, the company announced it would acquire Explora BioLabs.

In January 2023, the business announced it would acquire SAMDI Tech, Inc.

In February 2026, the CDMO business arm including sites in Rockville, Maryland; Memphis, Tennessee; Northridge, California; and Keele, United Kingdom was sold to GI Partners and formed as a new company Rose BioSolutions. The discovery services were sold to IQVIA for $145 million.

== UK ==
=== Elphinstone Research Centre ===
Elphinstone Research Centre is a medical research centre, part of the Charles River Laboratories, east of Edinburgh, south of Tranent, in East Lothian. In the 1970s, it was the site of Inveresk Research International. Inveresk had been founded in 1957 and was situated in the former offices of the Institute of Seaweed Research. It is situated to the south of Tranent, between the B6414 and B6371, north-east of Elphinstone. The site employs around 1300 people.

== See also ==
- List of S&P 500 companies
