= Tom Spiegel =

American banker and investor

Thomas Spiegel (born April 16, 1946) is an American banker and investor. He was former chief executive of the failed Columbia Savings & Loan.

== Early life ==
Spiegel was born in Kosche, Czechoslovakia on April 16, 1946, to Abraham and Edita Spiegel; his family immigrated to the United States in 1948. His parents, Abraham and Edita Spiegel, had been imprisoned in Auschwitz in 1944. Their 2-year-old son, Uziel, was killed in the Holocaust.

Spiegel attended Third Street School, John Burroughs Junior High School, and graduated from Beverly Hills High School in 1963. He earned a bachelor's degree in business in 1967 from the University of Southern California. He also attended Loyola Law School for one year.

Spiegel worked for both A.G. Becker & Co. and Drexel Burnham as a stock broker through 1973.

== Columbia Savings and Loan ==
Spiegel's father, Abraham Spiegel, bought a 50 percent interest in Eastland Savings & Loan, located in Anaheim, California. He later changed the name of the company to Columbia Savings & Loan. Columbia's headquarters was located in Beverly Hills. Spiegel became president and CEO in 1977.

Forbes Magazine rated Columbia as the number one savings and loan in the US based on return on equity and return on assets. It was considered one of the country's most profitable savings and loans for years. At one point, Spiegel family members together owned about half of the stock in Columbia, which was worth around $350 million.

Columbia's business strategy was to be a leader in the high yield bond market in terms of understanding credit and risk and in the residential lending market, Columbia was a leader on lending on high end residential properties. Columbia became one of Drexel Burnham’s largest clients in funding leveraged buyouts in the 80s.

Spiegel resigned as Chairman & CEO of Columbia in 1989 after the government targeted him because he was in charge of one of the leading financial institutions in the US doing business with Drexel Burnham.

== Federal case ==
In June 1990, federal regulators (specifically, the Office of Thrift Supervision, which is the primary regulator of the thrift industry) sued Spiegel seeking $40 million for "self-dealing, breach of fiduciary duty and unsafe and unsound practices in his management of Columbia." The charges arose from Columbia's loans to a luxury auto dealership that went sour at a cost of more than $5 million, the construction of a lavish headquarters that regulators sold at a loss of more than $20 million, Spiegel's receipt of a $3-million bonus in 1989 and his alleged use of company funds for personal airplane travel, a gun collection and furnishings for a $1-million Palm Springs condominium.

Spiegel issued a statement at the time saying he "forcefully denied all the charges" and "expressed outrage" at what he called "trial by press release.” Spiegel said, "For purely political reasons, OTS is seeking scapegoats to divert public attention from its gross incompetence.”

Spiegel's official trial began on January 11, 1994. The trial, which took place in a U.S. District Court in Los Angeles and lasted seven weeks ending the saga of one of the most prominent thrift failures of the past decade.

In the end, the government fined Spiegel $275,000. The Los Angeles Times wrote, "In a significant concession, the U.S. Office of Thrift Supervision also dropped its demand that Spiegel be banned from the banking and thrift industry. Spiegel, in exchange, dropped his claims of $1.9 million in back pay and legal expenses against the government." At the time, federal authorities acknowledged that their civil case was weakened by Spiegel's acquittal on criminal charges.

"The terms of Friday's settlement, taken alongside the criminal acquittal, call into question what the government has to show for its five-year pursuit of Spiegel, which a Wall Street Journal editorial once referred to as the case of "U.S. vs. the 1980s." The government has been criticized for its management of the financial crisis that engulfed the savings and loan industry beginning in the late 1980s." - The Los Angeles Times (2/25/95)

== Investments ==
He was a significant shareholder and member of the board of PortalPlayer, a supplier of digital and audio technology platforms for consumer electronics.

He was a major stockholder and Chairman of the executive committee at American Well, a privately held telehealth company based in Boston, Massachusetts that provides online urgent care web visits for patients in 46 states.

He was the chairman and CEO of Linq3, a U.S. company that designs, builds and markets devices for digital lottery gameplay from 2017-2019.

== Philanthropy ==
Spiegel is Chairman of the Thomas Spiegel Family Foundation, founded as the Columbia Savings Charitable Foundation in 1985. He served as Chairman of the Board of Trustees of the Adelson School (aka the Dr. Miriam and Sheldon G. Adelson Educational Campus from 2021-2023). In 2017, the foundation made a substantial gift to the Academy Museum of Motion Pictures in support of the Academy Museum in Los Angeles. The museum is expected to open in 2019. According to Variety magazine, the museum received donations from Netflix, Bloomberg Philanthropies, producer Charles Roven, and Tom Spiegel.

== Personal ==
Spiegel was married to Helene Berman. In 2008, he married Marilyn Winn. He resides in Las Vegas, Nevada.
