= Clara Worst Miller =

American professor and writer

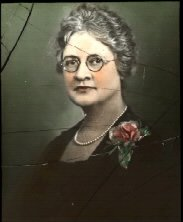
- Born: March 27, 1876; Ashland, Ohio
- Died: September 22, 1970; Fort Lauderdale, Florida
- Occupation(s): College professor and writer
- Known for: A Short History of Ashland College

Clara Worst Miller (née Worst; March 27, 1876 - September 22, 1970) was an American college professor and writer.

== Personal life ==
Clara Worst was born on March 27, 1876, to Elmore J. and Arminda (née Ash) Worst in Ashland, Ohio. She received a Bachelor of Literature degree from Hiram College in 1898, a Bachelor of Arts degree from Ashland College in 1926, and received a Master of Arts degree from the University of Chicago.

Miller married J. Allen Miller on December 22, 1896, and they had three children. She died on September 22, 1970, in Fort Lauderdale, Florida.

== Career ==
Miller was an associate professor of Latin at Ashland College from 1898 to 1952. She co-wrote a book about the history of Ashland College with a former president from that college, Edward Mason, titled A Short History of Ashland College. It was published in 1954 and includes information about the Brethren Church in Germany spreading into the United States, along with the church's interest in education. The book also includes parts of the college's history, from a planning meeting in 1877 and ending with the Founders' Hall being burned down in 1952.

Miller Hall was built at the college and named after her husband, after the two of them helped the college with its $40,000 debt. Without their help, Ashland College may have been shut down. Miller Hall was demolished after the fall 2010 semester.

Miller was a part of the Ashland Board of Education for 24 years, a president of the Federation of Women's Clubs, and a trustee at the Children's Home. She worked with the Middle-North District of the Ohio Federation of Women's Clubs. As part of Miller's work at Ashland College, she helped found the Women's Club and organize the YWCA.

== Legacy ==
Miller has an entry in Who's Who In The Midwest and Women of Ohio; a record of their achievements in the history of the state.
