= Sufficient similarity =

Para-legal concept in the United States

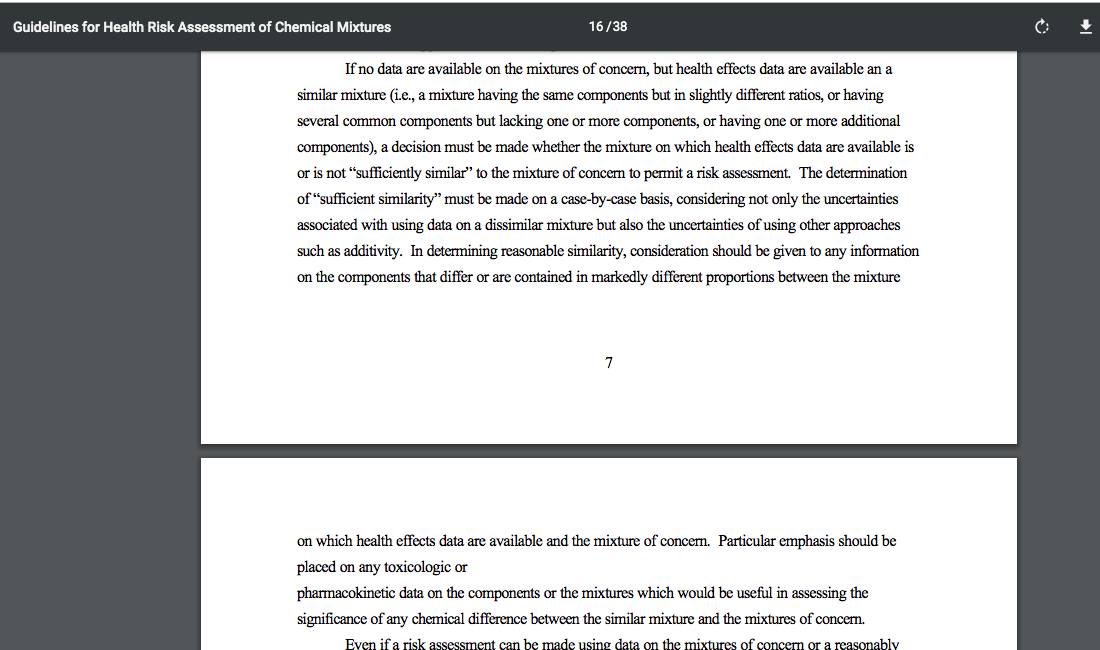
Part of the 'sufficient similarity' doctrine, from EPA Guidelines for the Health Risk Assessment of Chemical Mixtures

Sufficient similarity is a 20th-century para-legal concept used in the chemical industry for toxicological studies. The term was first employed in a restricted sense to assess surrogacy of chemical mixtures by the EPA, and has descended from there into the scientific argot.

The concept is somewhat nebulous, and statistics are involved. A group of America researchers in 2018 posed themselves the question how similar must a product be in order to be well-represented by the tested reference sample? Because the concept was derived from the EPA, chemical similarity and biological similarity are equally important. The concept is employed "so that safety data from the tested reference can be applied to untested materials," because "when toxicity data are not available for a chemical mixture of concern, US EPA guidelines allow risk assessment to be based on data for a surrogate mixture considered “sufficiently similar” in terms of chemical composition and component proportions."
