= Joseph D. Moody =

American historian

Joseph D. Moody (November 14, 1841 – November 17, 1909) was a U.S. dentist and served as president of the Historical Society of Southern California.

== Early life and education ==
Moody was born in Ashland, Ohio in 1841. He attended school in Ashland. On November 2, 1861, he enlisted in Co. I, 42nd Ohio Infantry of which regiment James A. Garfield was colonel. For nearly a year, he acted as Garfield's private secretary. Serving for 37 months, he was promoted to the rank of first lieutenant, and mustered out with that rank.

After leaving the service, he studied dentistry with Dr. Barcklay in Dalton, Ohio, and later completed his course in the Chicago Dental College.

== Career ==
In addition to his professional duties, Moody was active in Sunday school work, both in the county and in the state, taking especial interest in the better training of Sunday School teachers, and being the county secretary for some years. For several years, he served as president of the city board of education.

Removing to Los Angeles, California in 1893, he built up a large and lucrative practice. Moody was prominently identified with Sunday School work, and was for a number of years superintendent of Sunday School normal work in Southern California. He served as president of the Southern California Dental Association, and was at the time of his death lecturer in the Dental Department of the University of Southern California. He was a member of the Los Angeles Academy of Science.

He became a member of the Historical Society of Southern California in 1893 shortly after locating in Los Angeles. He was elected one of the Directors of the Society in 1894. He filled the office of President during the years of 1897 and 1898; also the office of vice-president several terms, and was a member of the board of directors at the time of his death. He contributed a number of valuable historical papers which were published in the Society's collections, among them, "Echoes from the American Revolution", "Some African Folk Lore", "How a Woman's Wit Saved California", "Some Aboriginal Alphabets", and "Sequoyah".

== Personal life ==
In 1869, he married Kate Cameron in Jesup, Iowa, and, after a few years, removed to Mendota, Illinois, where they lived for 20 years.

He died in 1909, his remains taken to Mendota for interment.
