= Toxicology testing =

Biochemical process

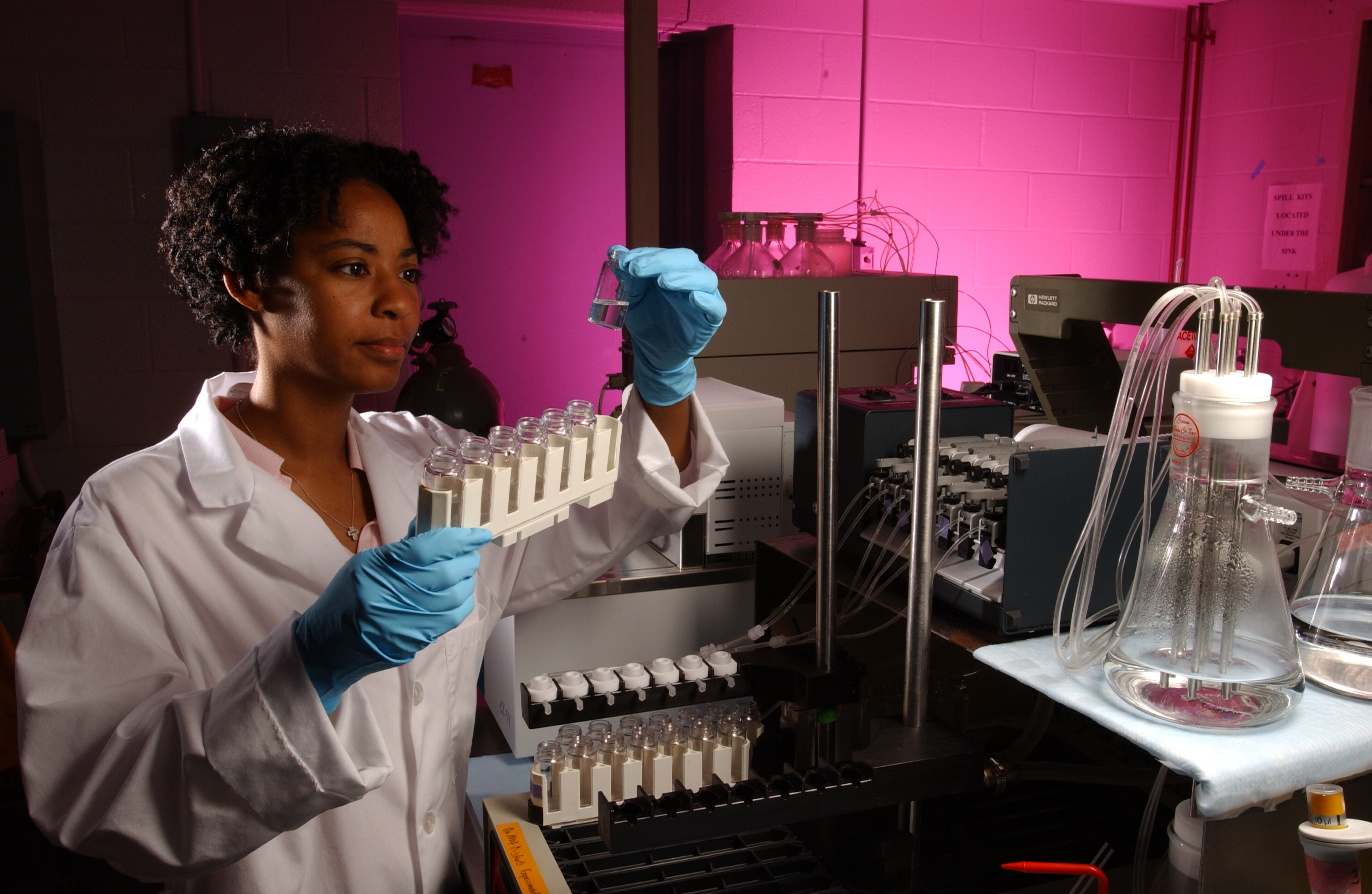
U.S. Army Public Health Center Toxicology Lab technician assessing samples

Toxicology testing, also known as safety assessment, or toxicity testing, is the process of determining the degree to which a substance of interest negatively impacts the normal biological functions of an organism, given a certain exposure duration, route of exposure, and substance concentration.

Toxicology testing is often conducted by researchers who follow established toxicology test protocols for a certain substance, mode of exposure, exposure environment, duration of exposure, a particular organism of interest, or for a particular developmental stage of interest. Toxicology testing is commonly conducted during preclinical development for a substance intended for human exposure. Stages of in silico, in vitro and in vivo research are conducted to determine safe exposure doses in model organisms. If necessary, the next phase of research involves human toxicology testing during a first-in-man study. Toxicology testing may be conducted by the pharmaceutical industry, biotechnology companies, contract research organizations, or environmental scientists.

== History ==
The study of poisons and toxic substances has a long history dating back to ancient times, when humans recognized the dangers posed by various natural compounds. However, the formalization and development of toxicology as a distinct scientific discipline can be attributed to notable figures like Paracelsus (1493–1541) and Orfila (1757–1853).

Paracelsus (1493–1541): Often regarded as the "father of toxicology, Paracelsus, whose real name was Theophrastus von Hohenheim, challenged prevailing beliefs about poisons during the Renaissance era. He introduced the fundamental concept that "the dose makes the poison," emphasizing that the toxicity of a substance depends on its quantity. This principle remains a cornerstone of toxicology.

Mathieu Orfila (1787–1853): A Spanish-born chemist and toxicologist, Orfila made significant contributions to the field in the 19th century. He is best known for his pioneering work in forensic toxicology, particularly in developing methods for detecting and analyzing poisons in biological samples. Orfila's work played a vital role in establishing toxicology as a recognized scientific discipline and laid the groundwork for modern forensic toxicology practices in criminal investigations and legal cases.

== Prevalence ==
Around one million animals, primate and non-primate, are used every year in Europe in toxicology tests. In the UK, one-fifth of animal experiments are toxicology tests.

== Methodology ==
Toxicity tests examine finished products such as pesticides, medications, cosmetics, food additives such as artificial sweeteners, packing materials, and air freshener, or their chemical ingredients. The substances are tested using a variety of methods including dermal application, respiration, orally, injected or in water sources. They are applied to the skin or eyes; injected intravenously, intramuscularly, or subcutaneously; inhaled either by placing a mask over the animals, or by placing them in an inhalation chamber; or administered orally, placing them in the animals' food or through a tube into the stomach. Doses may be given once, repeated regularly for many months, or for the lifespan of the animal. Toxicity tests can also be conducted on materials need to be disposed such as sediment to be disposed in a marine environment.

Initial toxicity tests often involve computer modelling (in silico) to predict toxicokinetic pathways or to predict potential exposure points by modelling weather and water currents to determine which animals or regions that will be most affected. Other less intensive and more common in vitro toxicology tests involve, amongst others, microtox assays to observe bacteria growth and productivity. This can be adapted to plant life measure photosynthesis levels and growth of exposed plants.

If a chemical mixture is sufficiently similar to one that has already been tested, then further testing may not be necessary.

== Contract research organizations ==
A contract research organization (CRO) is an organization that provides support to the pharmaceutical, biotechnology, chemical, and medical device industries in the form of research services outsourced on a contract basis. A CRO may provide toxicity testing services, along with others such as assay development, preclinical research, clinical research, clinical trials management, and pharmacovigilance. CROs also support foundations, research institutions, and universities, in addition to governmental organizations (such as the NIH, EMEA, etc.).

== Regulation ==
=== United States ===
In the United States, toxicology tests are subject to Good Laboratory Practice guidelines and other Food and Drug Administration laws.

=== Europe ===
Animal testing for cosmetic purposes is currently banned all across the European Union.

== See also ==
- Animal testing
- Children's Environmental Exposure Research Study
