= James G. Wilson =

James G. Wilson (1915–1987) was an embryologist and anatomist, known for his Six Principles of Teratology. In 1960, he co-founded The Teratology Society, and was since then one of its most active members.

== Six principles ==
Along with this new awareness of the in utero vulnerability of the developing mammalian embryo came the development and refinement of The Six Principles of Teratology, which are still applied today. These principles of teratology were put forth by Jim Wilson in 1959 and in his monograph Environment and Birth Defects.[8] These principles guide the study and understanding of teratogenic agents and their effects on developing organisms:

Susceptibility to teratogenesis depends on the genotype of the conceptus and the manner in which this interacts with adverse environmental factors.

Susceptibility to teratogenesis varies with the developmental stage at the time of exposure to an adverse influence. There are critical periods of susceptibility to agents and organ systems affected by these agents.

Teratogenic agents act in specific ways on developing cells and tissues to initiate sequences of abnormal developmental events.

The access of adverse influences to developing tissues depends on the nature of the influence. Several factors affect the ability of a teratogen to contact a developing conceptus, such as the nature of the agent itself, route and degree of maternal exposure, rate of placental transfer and systemic absorption, and composition of the maternal and embryonic/fetal genotypes.

There are four manifestations of deviant development (Death, Malformation, Growth Retardation and Functional Defect).

Manifestations of deviant development increase in frequency and degree as dosage increases from the No Observable Adverse Effect Level (NOAEL) to a dose producing 100% Lethality (LD100).

The James G. Wilson Publication Award is annually presented in recognition of the best paper accepted or published in the journal Birth Defects Research (formerly known as Teratology).

== See also ==
- Teratology
- Developmental biology
