= James Lillie =

American business executive

James E. Lillie
- Born: Camden, New Jersey
- Education: University of Wisconsin–Madison
- Occupation: Business Executive
- Known for: CEO of Jarden Corp. (2011 - 2015)
- Board member of: Tiffany & Co., Nomad Foods, APi Group Corp., Mariposa Capital
- Spouse: Lisa Sheffield-Lillie
- Children: 3

James E. Lillie is an American business executive. He is Vice Chairman of Mariposa Capital, a private family office. Since 2017, he has been a member of the Board of Directors of Tiffany & Co, and was named Co-Chairman of APi Group, Inc in 2019. Lillie is on the boards of Nomad Foods Inc., Acuren Corporation and Sweet Oak, Inc. He was CEO of Jarden Corp. from 2011 until its 2015 sale to Newell Brands. Lillie is long-term business partners with Martin E. Franklin and Ian G. H. Ashken. He has been a guest and guest host on CNBC and Bloomberg TV.

== Background ==
Lillie was born in Camden, New Jersey, and lived in Pittsburgh, Pennsylvania; Madison, Wisconsin; Nashville, Tennessee; and in Valencia Spain and Mallorca Spain as a child since his father was an Oscar Mayer executive. As a teen, he lived in Valencia, Spain, when his father was president of Oscar Mayer Europe and finished his senior year of high school there, even after his parents moved to Chicago. He returned to the US after high school and graduated from the University of Wisconsin in 1983 with a Bachelor of Arts degree. While at the university he was a saber fencer on the University of Wisconsin Fencing team.

== Career ==
After college, Lillie worked in the human-resources departments of Sun Electric and was a labor negotiator and HR generalist at the CECO corporation. He worked, from 1990 until 1999, in various senior level management positions in Human Resources, Operations, and Finance with World Color, Inc. From 1999 to 2000, he was the Executive Vice President of Operations at Walter Industries, Inc. From 2000 to 2003, he was the Executive Vice President of Operations at Moore Corporation, Limited.

Lillie joined Jarden Corp. in August 2003 as the COO and then became the President in January 2004. In 2011 he became the CEO, a role he held until the company was sold to Newell Brands in April, 2015. Lillie and his partners, Martin E. Franklin and Ian G.H. Ashken, sold Jarden for $15.4 Billion dollars. Over the 15 year existence of Jarden it yielded a more than 5,000%+ return for its investors, making it the top performing consumer stock on the New York Stock Exchange during that period of time. Fortune Magazine named Lillie as one of the top 50 CEOs in 2012.

Lillie is Vice Chairman and a Partner at Mariposa Capital, a private family office based in Miami Beach, Florida, and sits on the Board of Directors of Royal Oak Enterprises, a private investment asset of Mariposa Capital. He also sits on the Board of Directors of NYSE-listed Tiffany & Co, as well as Nomad Foods. At Tiffany, he is Chair of the Sustainability Committee and sits on both the Audit and Finance Committees. He has been Chair of Nomad Foods’ Audit Committee since the company’s founding. Lillie joined the Board of Directors of the US-China Business Council in June 2015.

Lillie is a founder and board member of J2 Acquisition Holdings, a $1.25 billion acquisition vehicle that listed on the London Stock Exchange in October 2017. J2 acquired APi Group, Inc., a market-leading business services provider of safety, specialty, and industrial services, for $2.9 billion, in 2019, at which time the company changed its name to APi Group Corporation. The company moved its listing to the NYSE, under the symbol APG, in April 2020. Lillie has been Co-Chairman of APi Group since its founding.

== Charitable work ==
Lillie and his wife, Lisa Sheffield-Lillie established a Great People Scholarship at the University of Wisconsin–Madison in 2012. As Lillie explained, "By partnering with the University of Wisconsin we are making scholarship dollars initially available for students at the Madison campus." The Lillie family has established similar scholarship programs in the name of their children at the University of New Hampshire, Northeastern University and the University of Denver.

== Family life ==
He is married to Lisa Sheffield-Lillie and has three adult children
