= Vivmark Residential =

Apartment real estate investment trust

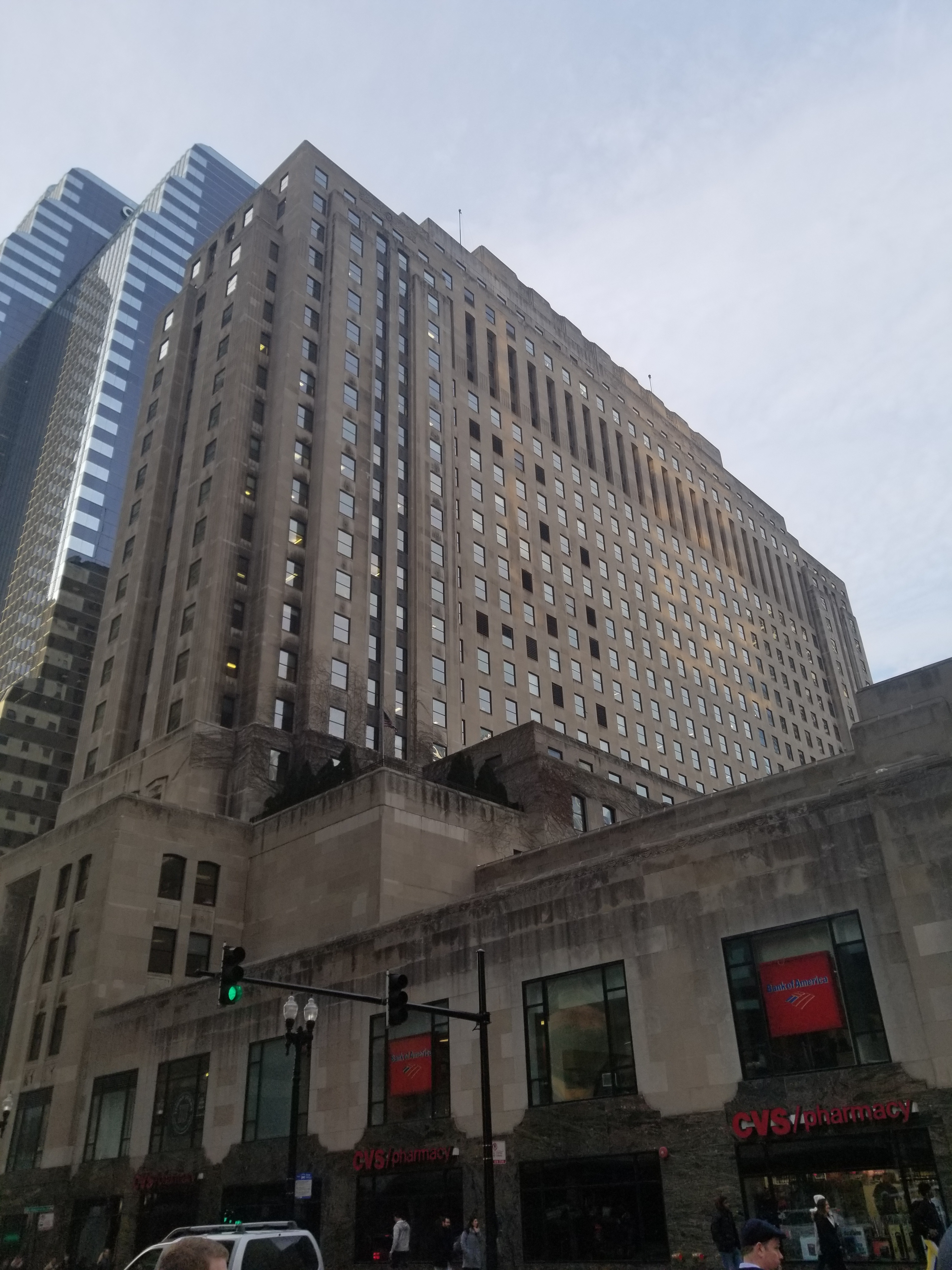
- Type: Public
- Traded as: NYSE: VMRK; S&P 500 component
- Industry: Apartments
- Predecessor: AvalonBay Communities; Equity Residential
- Founded: 1969; 57 years ago
- Founder: Sam Zell
- Headquarters: Riverside Plaza; Chicago, Illinois; Arlington, Virginia
- Key people: Benjamin Schall (CEO); Stephen Sterrett (Chairman); Kevin O'Shea (CFO)
- Services: Property management
- Revenue: ▲US$2.980 billion (2024)
- Net income: ▲US$1.032 billion (2024)
- Total assets: ▲US$20.834 billion (2024)
- Total equity: ▼US$11.044 billion (2024)
- Number of employees: Approximately 2,500 (2024)
- Website: www.vivmarkresidential.com

Vivmark Residential (formerly Equity Residential), based in Arlington, Virginia, and Chicago, Illinois, is a real estate investment trust that invests in apartments. As of August 2026, the company owned or had investments in 184,000 rental apartments and had over 11,100 apartments under construction.

It is the largest owner of apartments in the United States and the 18th largest apartment property manager in the United States.

== History ==
The company had its origins in Equity Finance and Management Company, founded in 1969 by Sam Zell. In 1993, the company acquired a large portfolio of properties from Starwood Capital Group, owned by Barry Sternlicht and Bob Faith, in exchange for a 20% stake in the company. Starwood had acquired the properties via government auctions after the savings and loan crisis. In August 1993, the company became a public company via an initial public offering. At that time, the company owned 22,000 apartments.

In 1997, the company acquired Wellsford Residential Property Trust for $620 million in stock and the assumption of $346 million of debt. It also acquired Evans Withycombe Residential for $625 million in stock and the assumption of $432 million in debt.

In 1998, the company acquired a portfolio of 5,774 apartments from Lincoln Property Company for $465 million. It also acquired Merry Land, which owned 34,990 units in the southeast United States, for $1.17 billion in stock as well as $656 million in debt and $270 million in preferred stock.

In 1999, the company acquired Lexford Residential Trust for $203 million in stock and the assumption of $530 million of debt. Lexford owned mainly one-story affordable housing units, rented to households with incomes between $25,000 and $35,000.

In January 2003, CEO Douglas Crocker retired. During his tenure, the company increased its ownership from 22,000 apartments to 227,000 apartments. In 2006, the company sold its Lexford affordable housing division, which included 27,115 apartment units, for $1.09 billion.

In February 2013, the company and AvalonBay Communities closed a $9 billion deal to acquire Archstone from Lehman Brothers. In 2013, the company sold 8,010 apartment units to a joint venture of Goldman Sachs and Greystar Real Estate Partners for $1.5 billion. In 2016, the company sold 23,262 apartments to Starwood Capital Group for $5.365 billion.

In August 2026, the company completed a merger of equals with AvalonBay Communities and changed its name to Vivmark Residential.

== Legal issues ==
In 2022, the company agreed to pay approximately $2 million to settle a lawsuit filed by Attorney General for the District of Columbia Karl Racine alleging that the company offered misleading rent discounts on a rent-controlled building in Washington, D.C.

The company was sued in a class action due to allegations that the late payment fees that it charged, including a $50 minimum fee even if rent was just one day late, and compounding fees and penalties, were in violation of California law. In a settlement finalized in 2026, the company agreed to pay $43 million to over 200,000 tenants in California as reimbursement of excessive fees.

In a multi-district class action lawsuit, the company and 10 other large landlords were accused of engaging in an unlawful conspiracy to use RealPage's revenue management software to share competitively sensitive data and coordinate rent increases. In 2026, as part of a settlement with all of the defendants, the company agreed to pay $56 million to settle the allegations.
