= Great American Economic Revival Industry Groups =

Organizations established for the COVID-19 pandemic

The Great American Economic Revival Industry Groups were created by U.S. President Donald Trump to combat the economic impact of the COVID-19 pandemic.

Trump originally proposed a second task force, following the White House Coronavirus Task Force. He later referred to the group as the "opening our country taskforce" and "opening our country council". Larry Kudlow and Steve Mnuchin were expected to be named members. Further details were expected to be announced in mid April 2020.

== Members ==
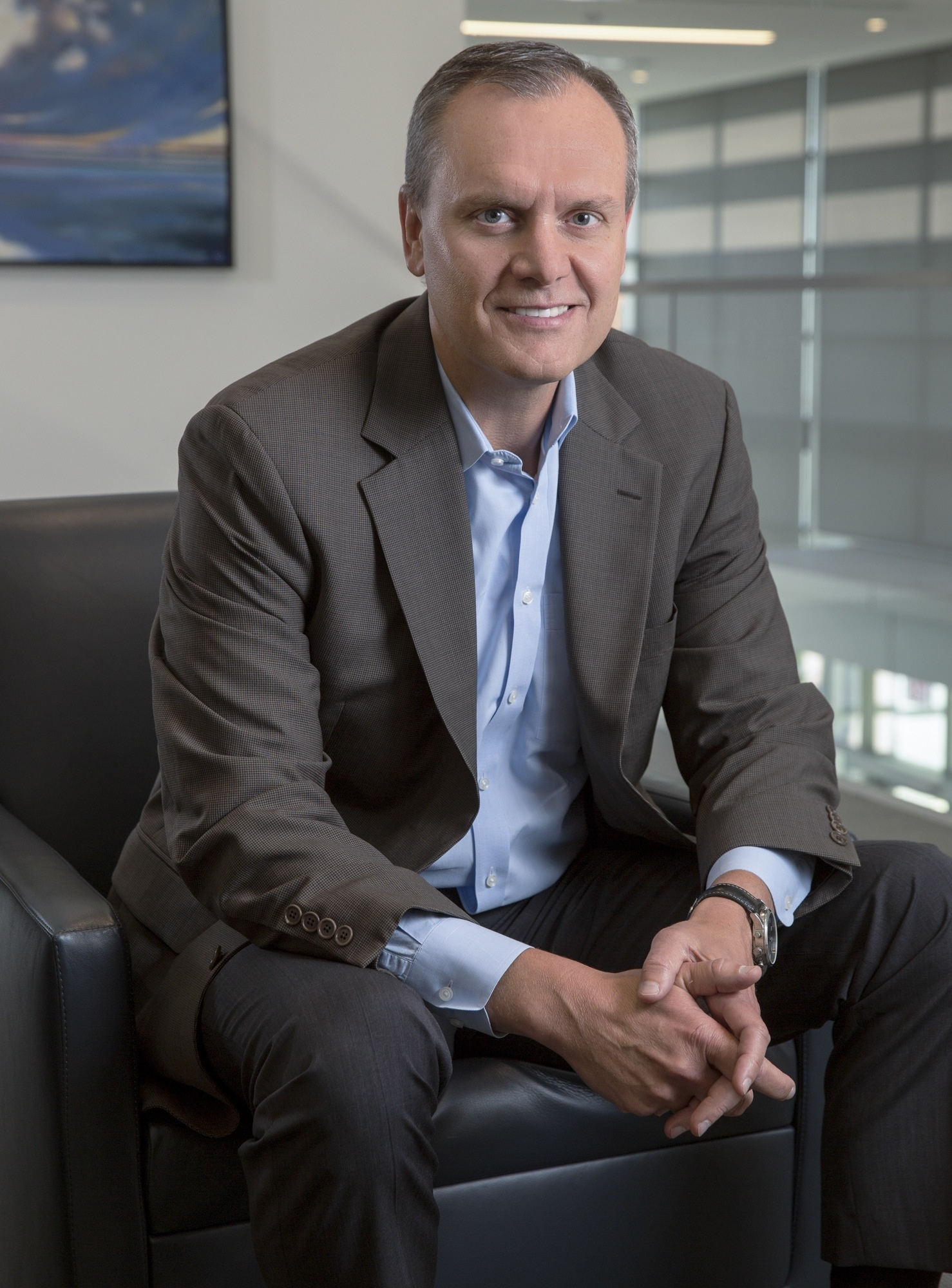
Darius Adamczyk of Honeywell (2017)

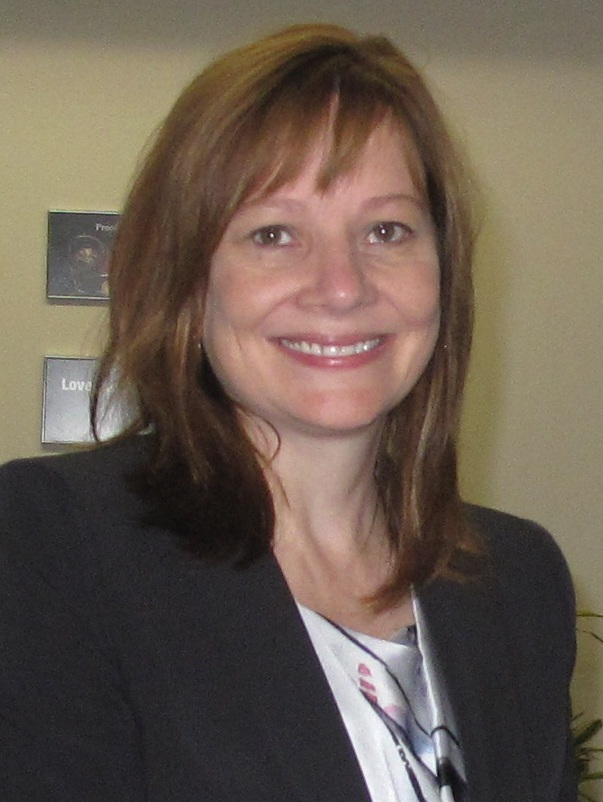
Mary Barra of General Motors (2014)

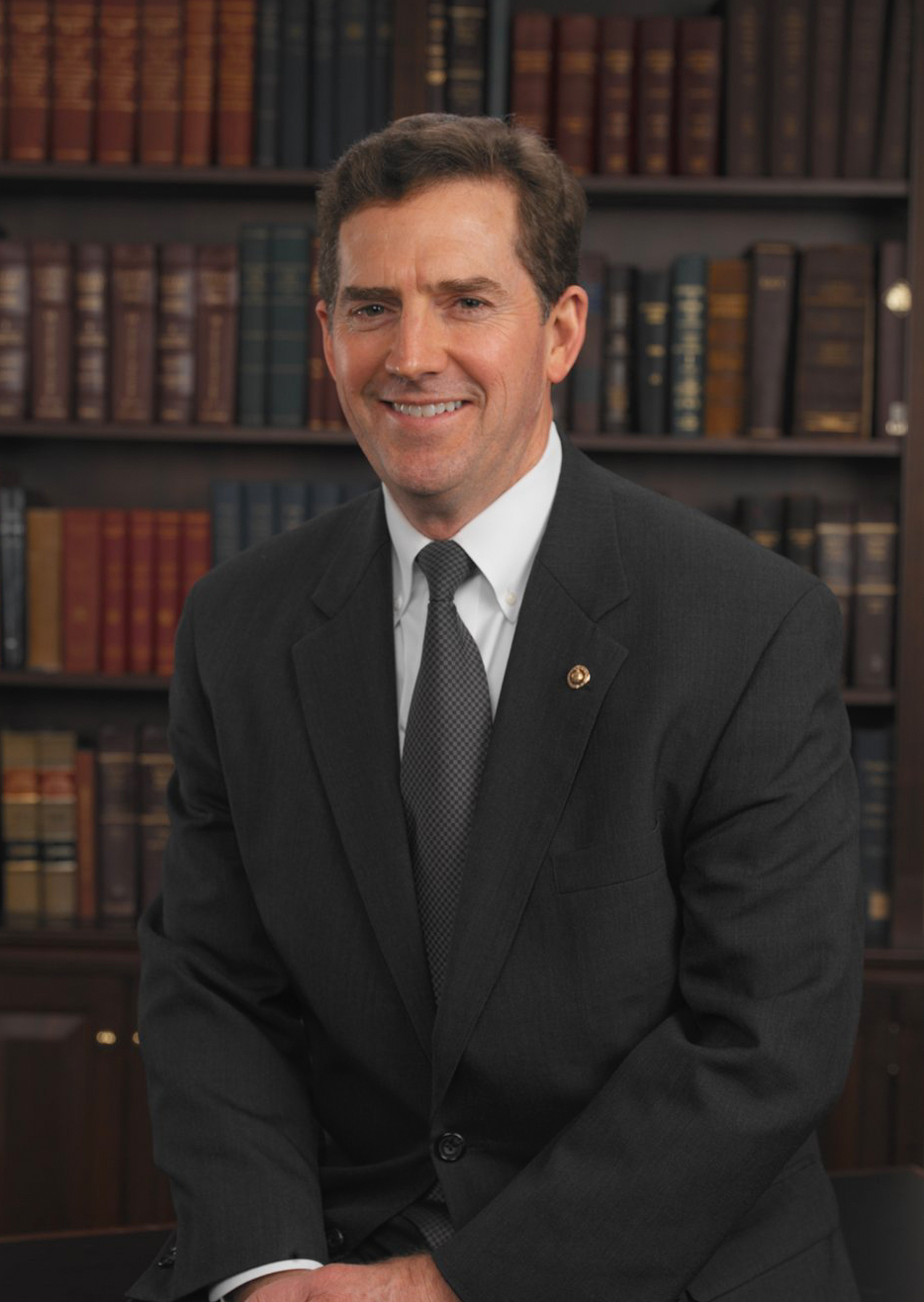
Jim DeMint in 2005

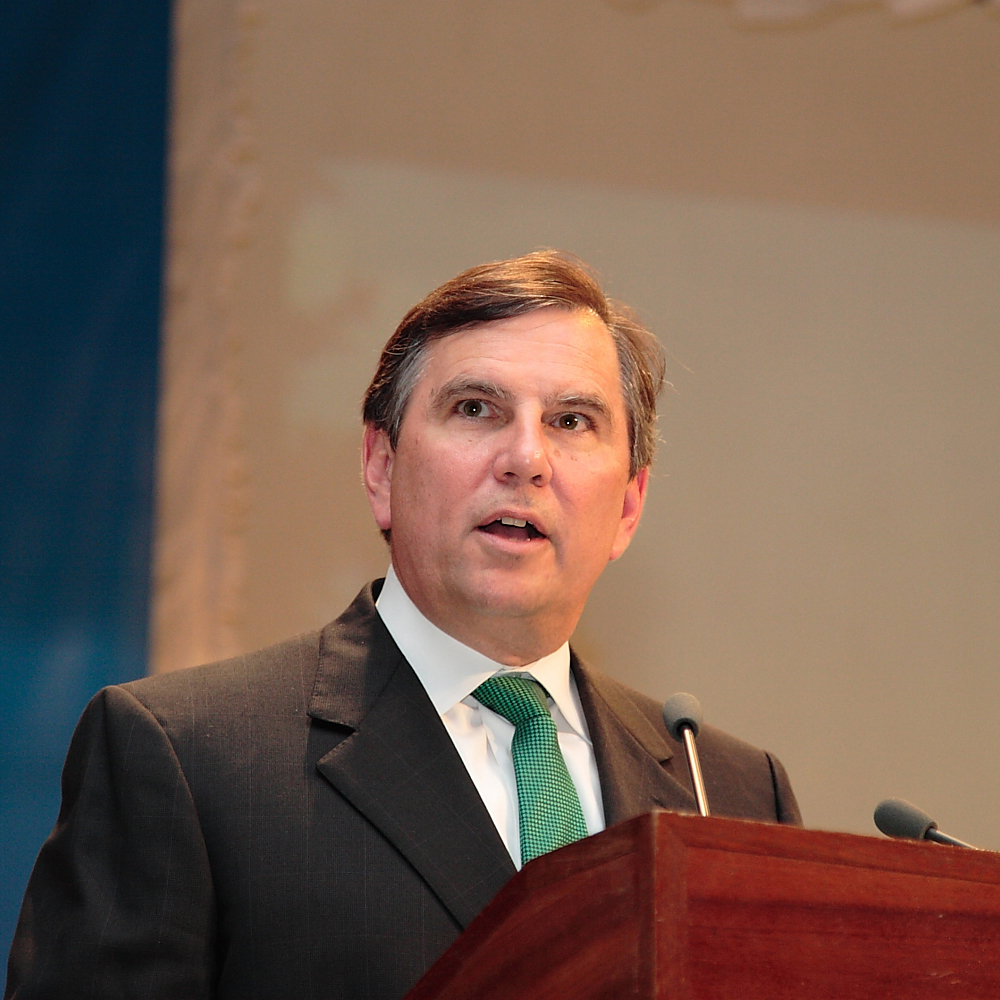
David Farr of Emerson Electric (2011)

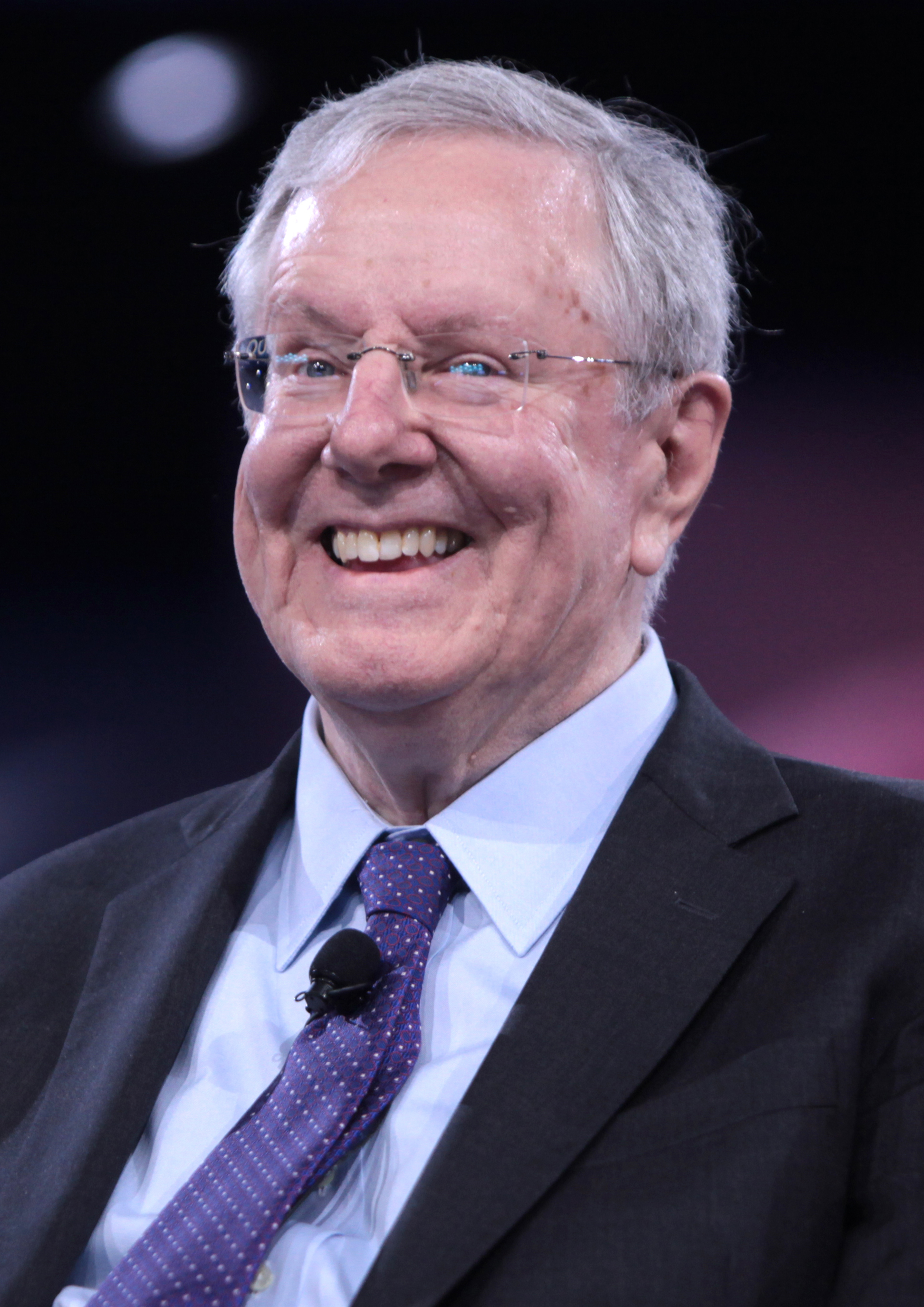
Steve Forbes in 2016

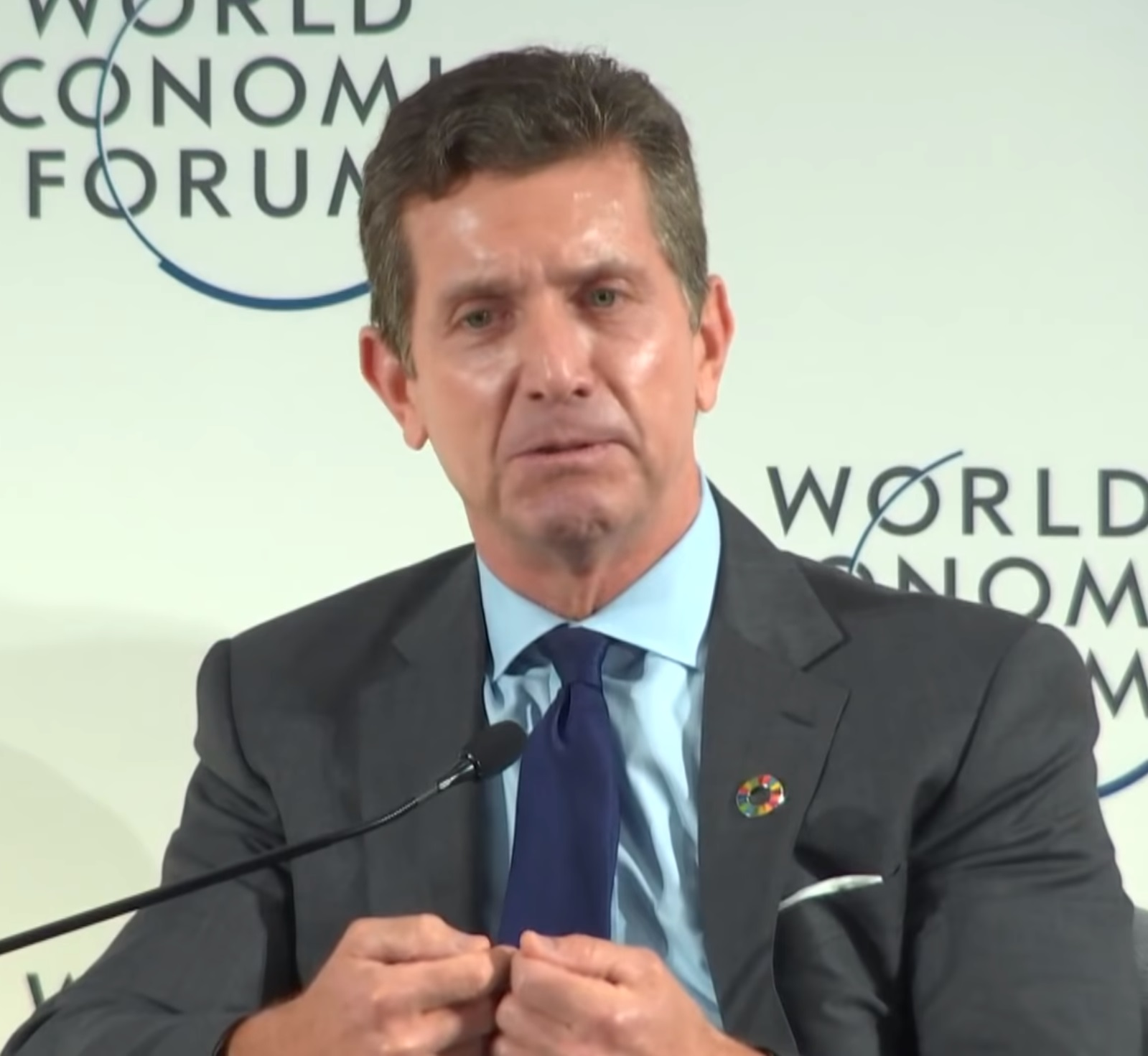
Alex Gorsky of Johnson & Johnson (2018)

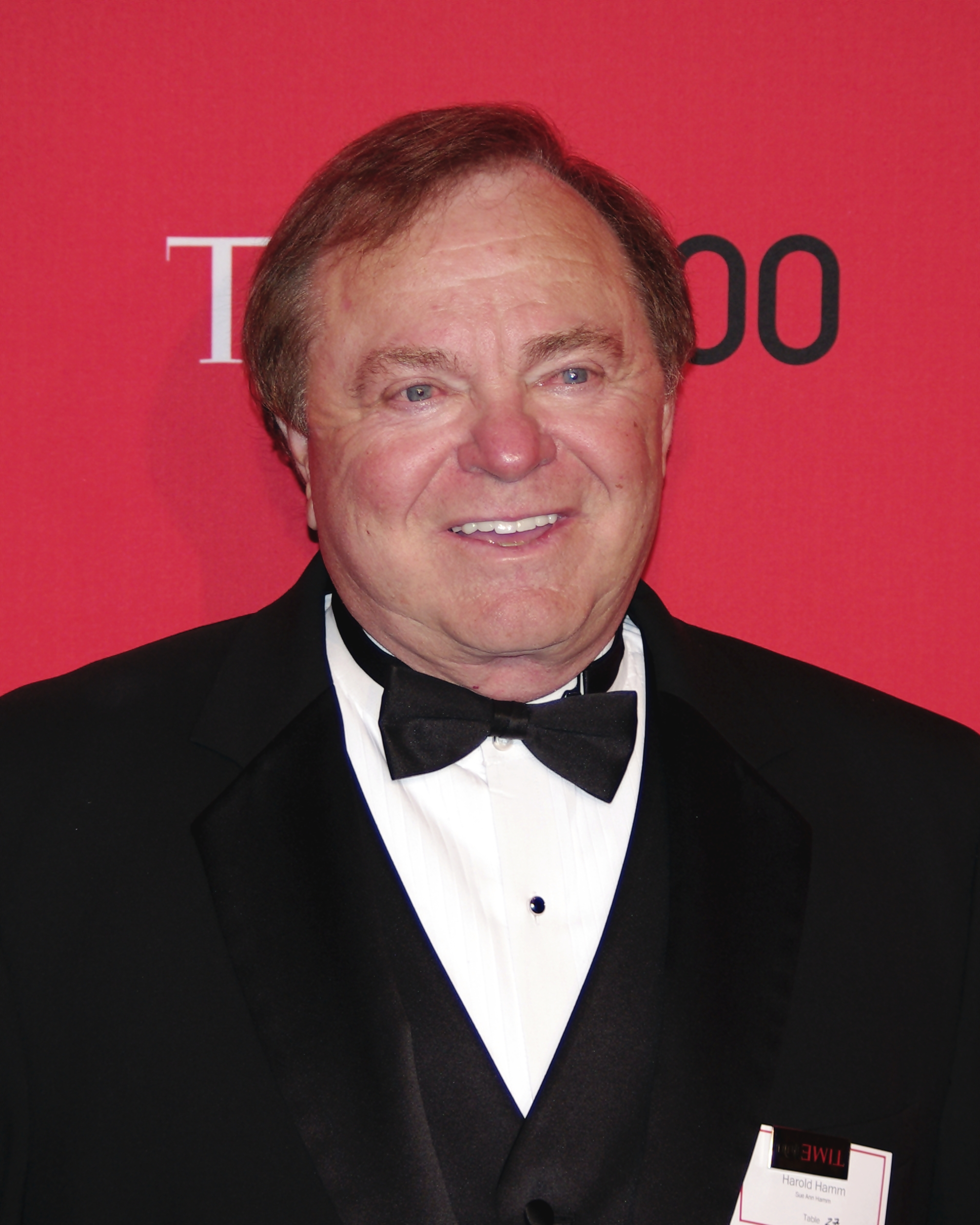
Harold Hamm of Continental Resources (2012)

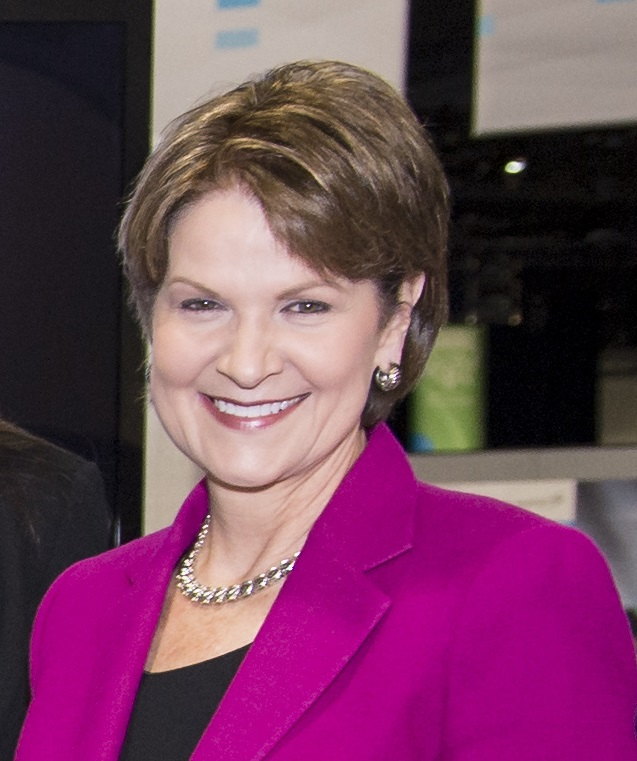
Marillyn Hewson of Lockheed Martin (2014)

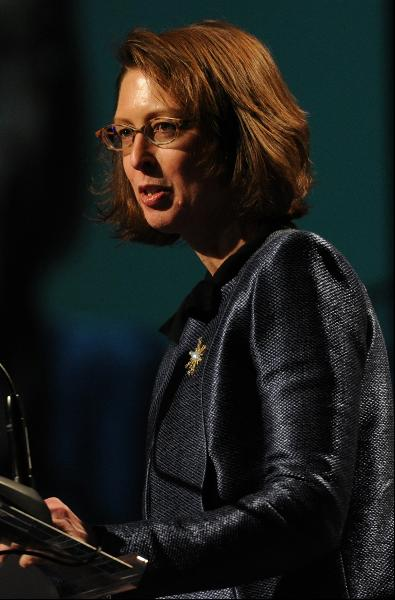
Abigail Johnson of Fidelity Investments (2012)

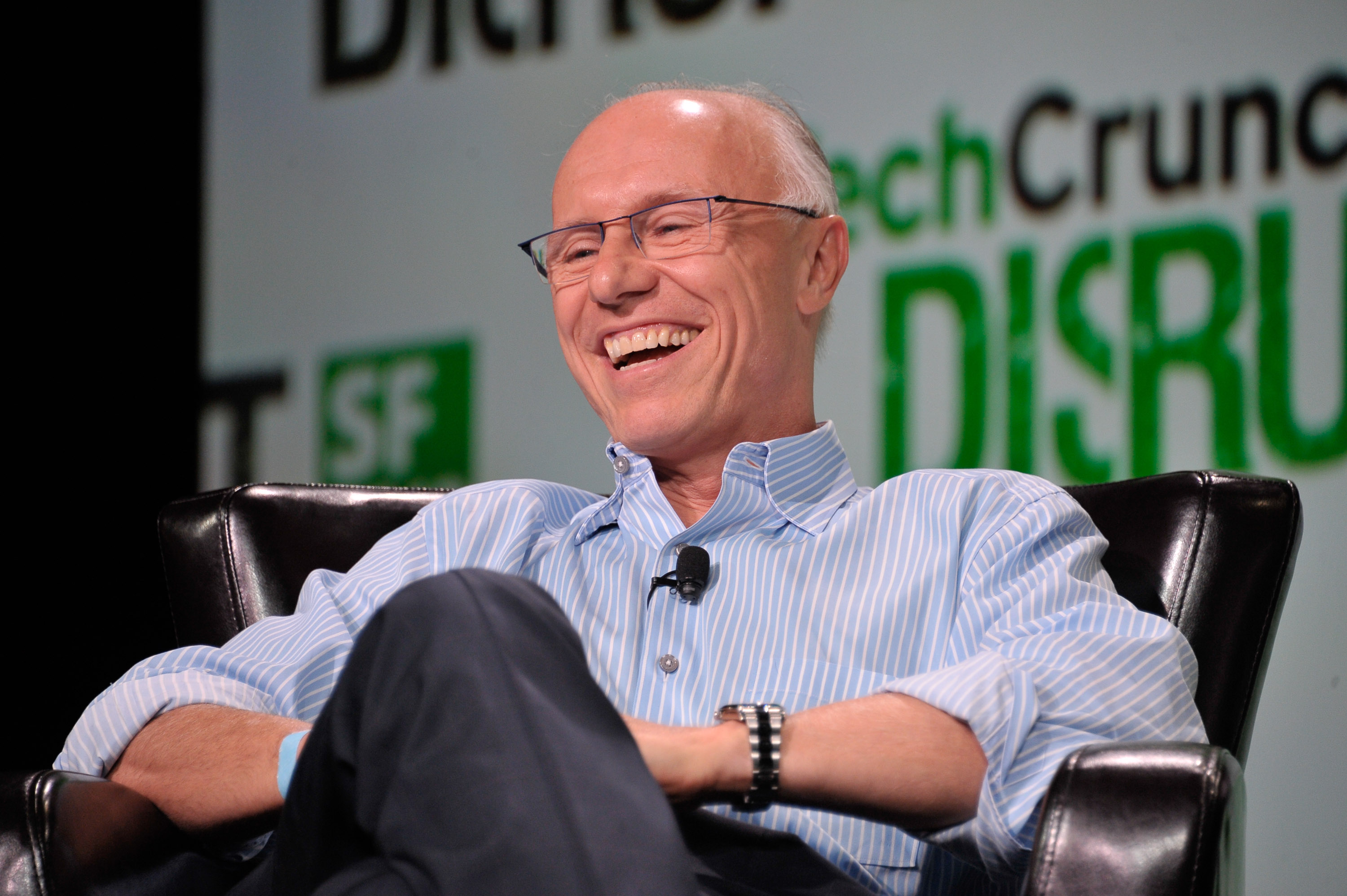
Douglas Leone of Sequoia Capital (2013)

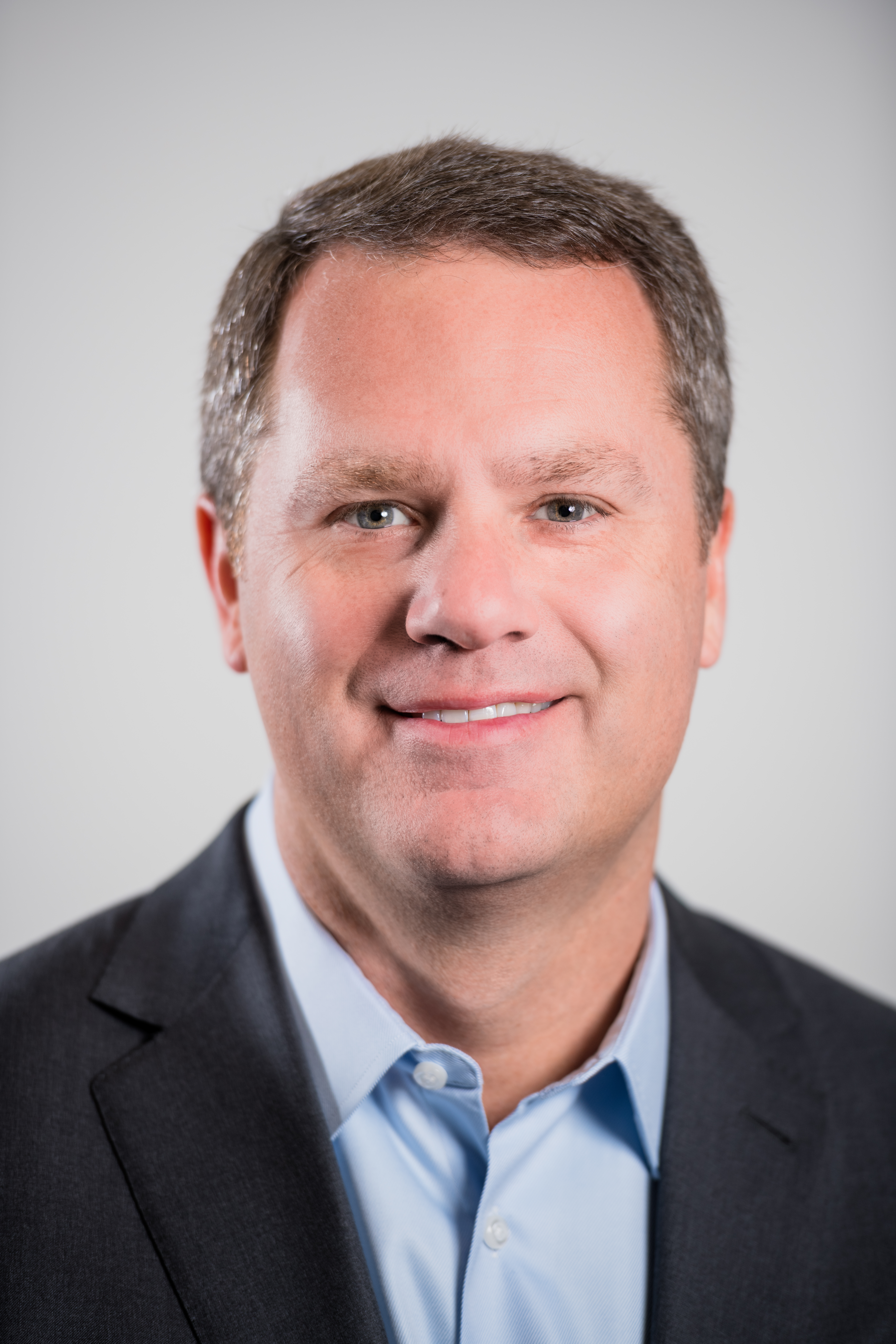
Doug McMillon of Walmart (2019)

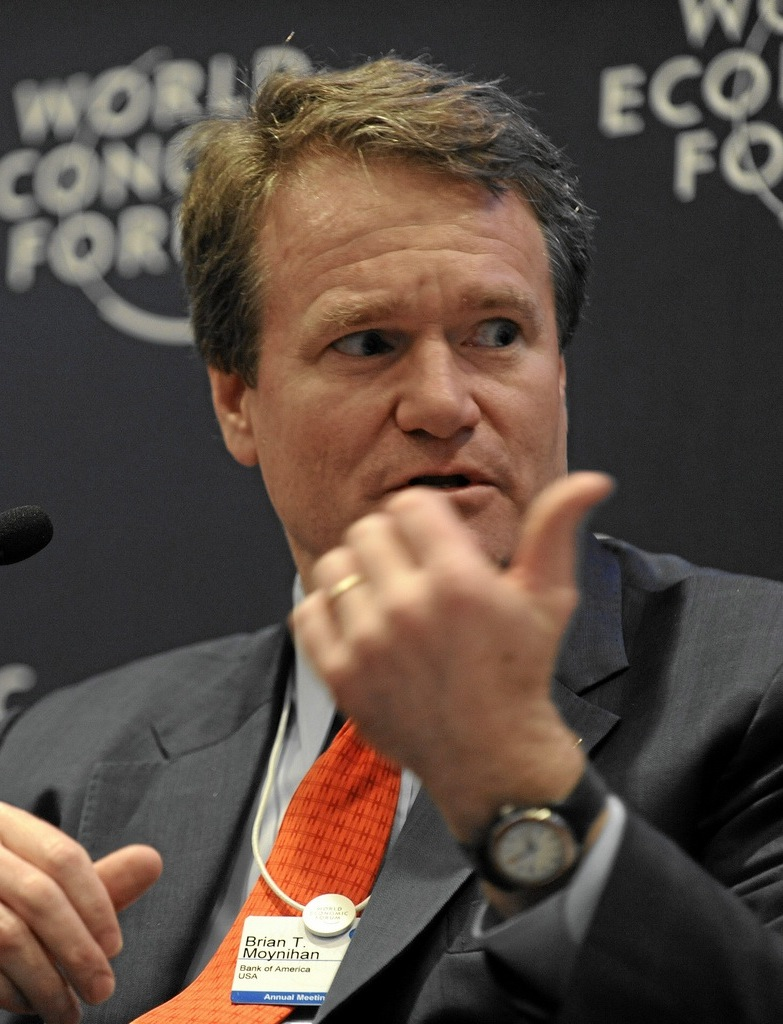
Brian Moynihan of Bank of America (2010)

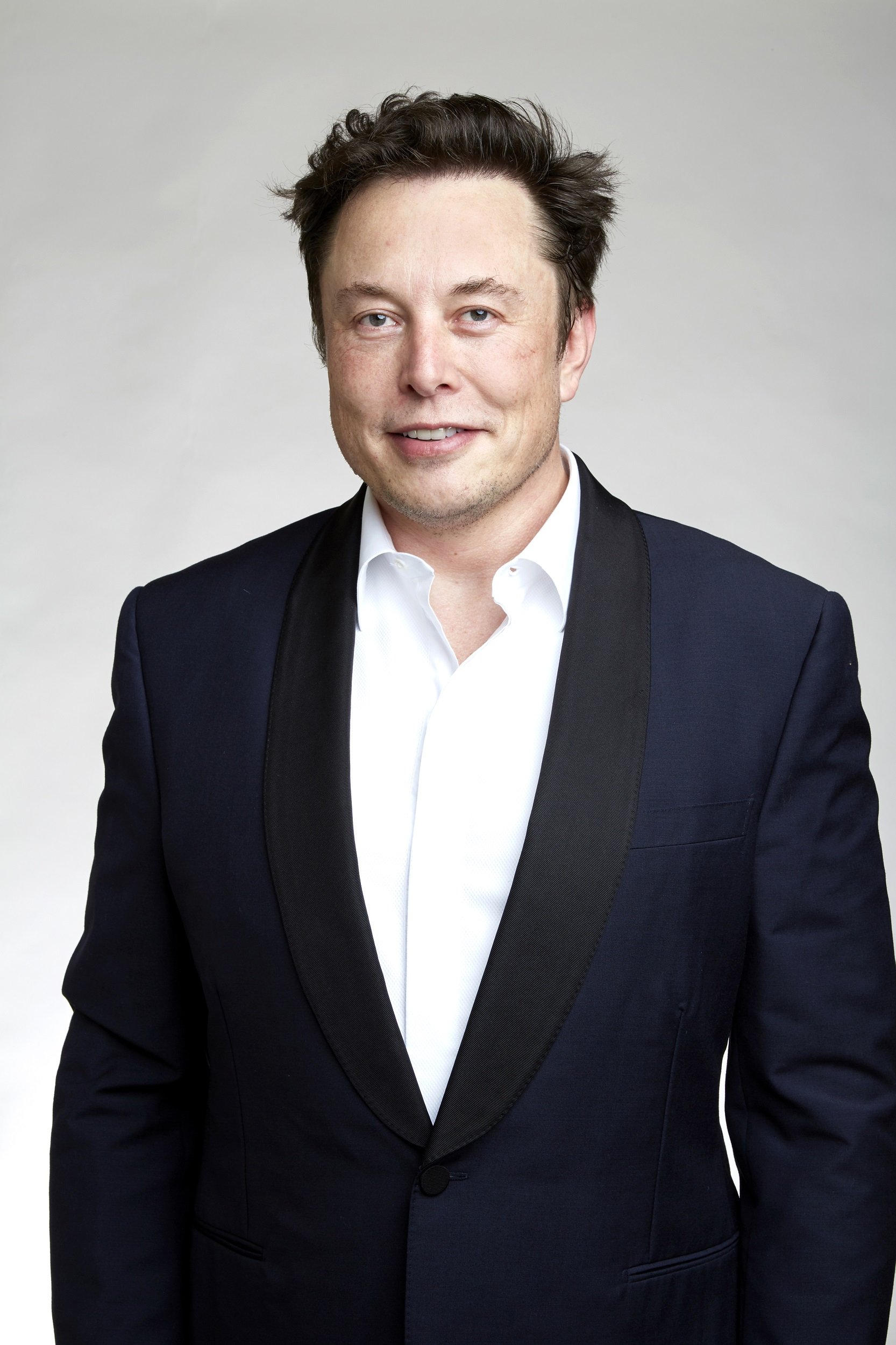
Elon Musk of Tesla, Inc. (2018)

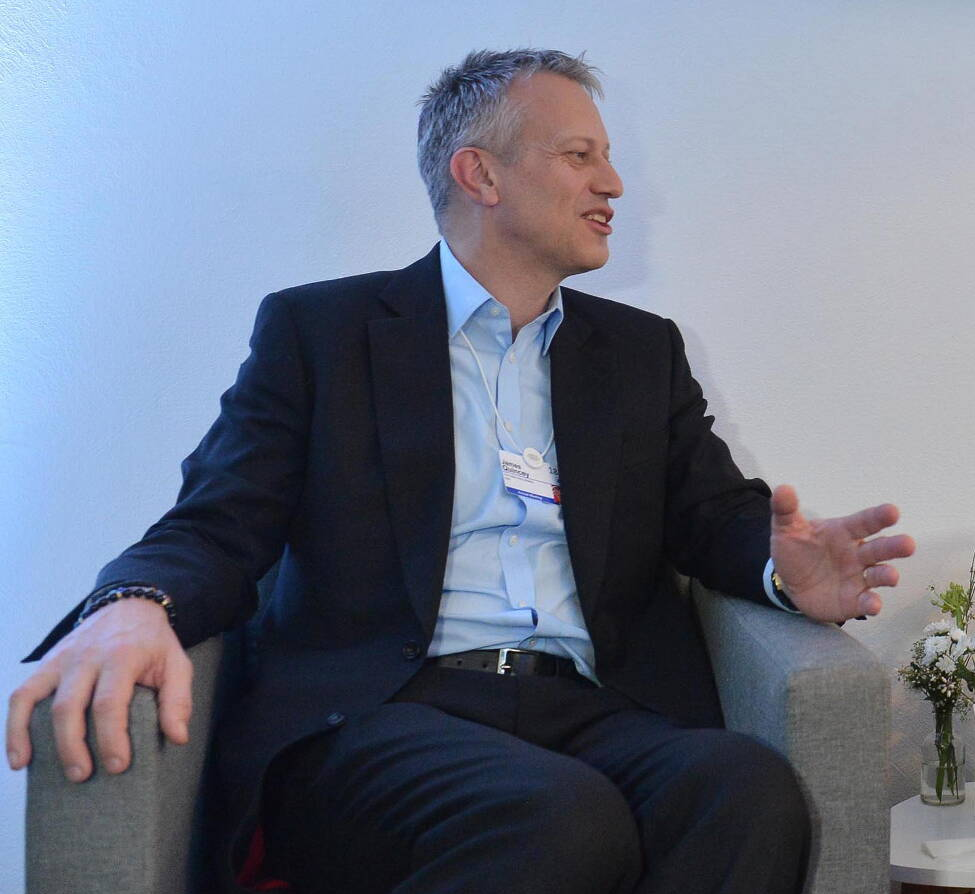
James Quincey of The Coca-Cola Company (2018)

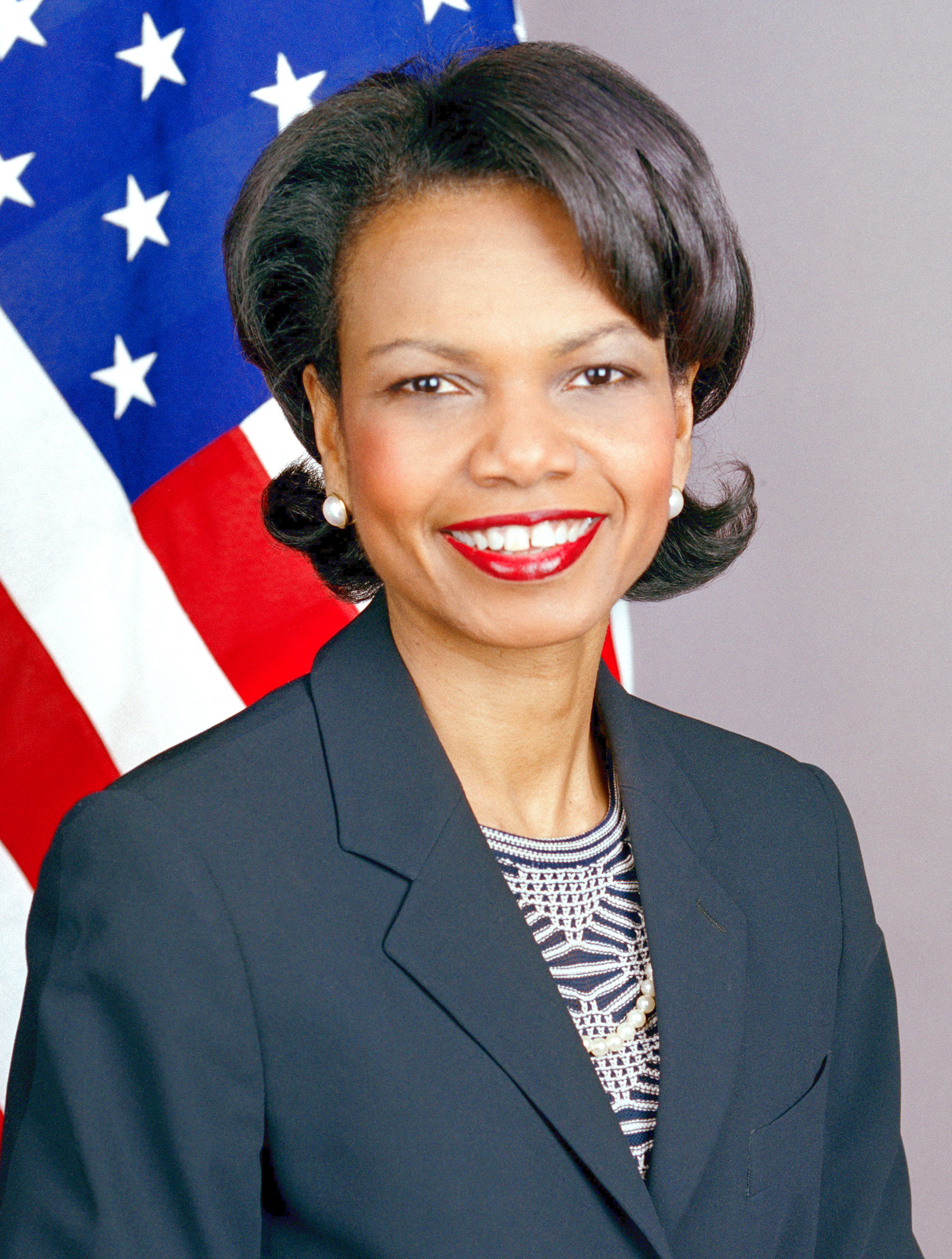
Condoleezza Rice in 2005

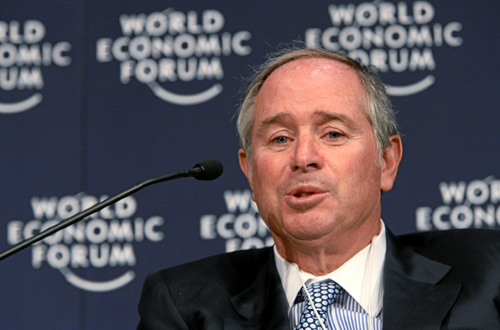
Stephen A. Schwarzman of The Blackstone Group (2008)

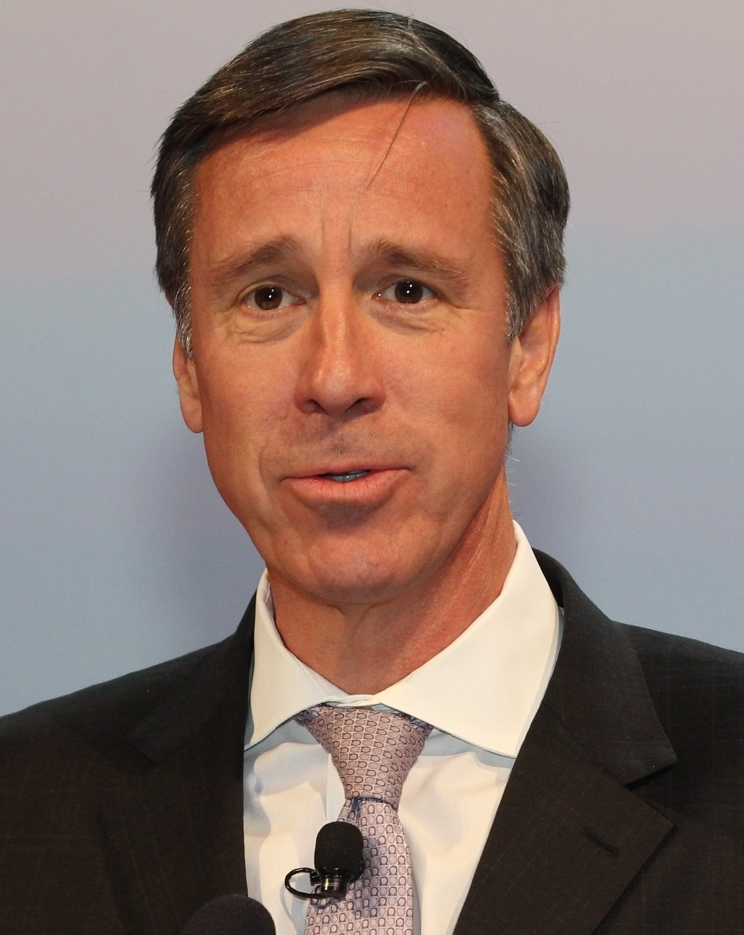
Arne Sorenson of Marriott International (2016)

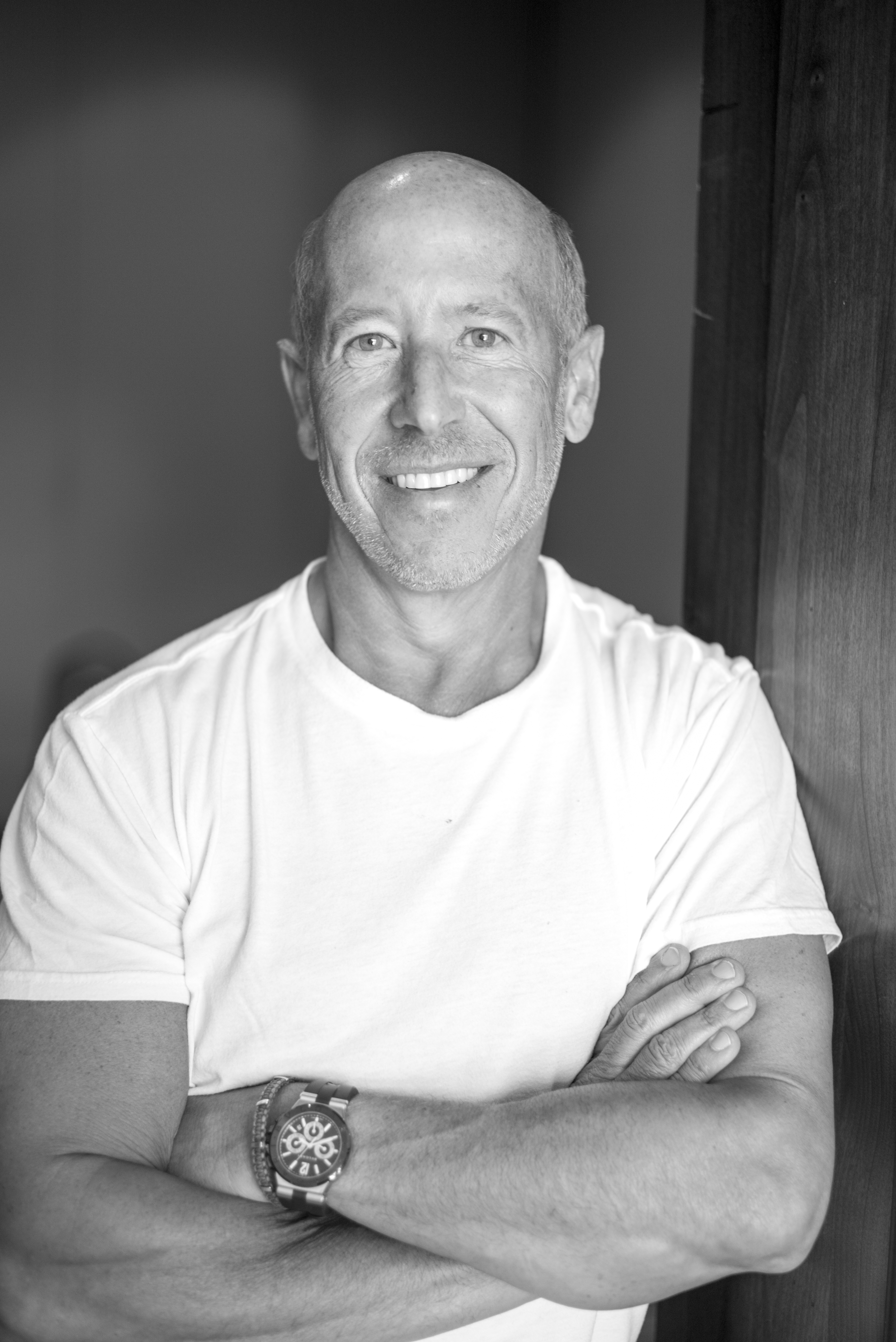
Barry Sternlicht of Starwood Capital Group (2016)

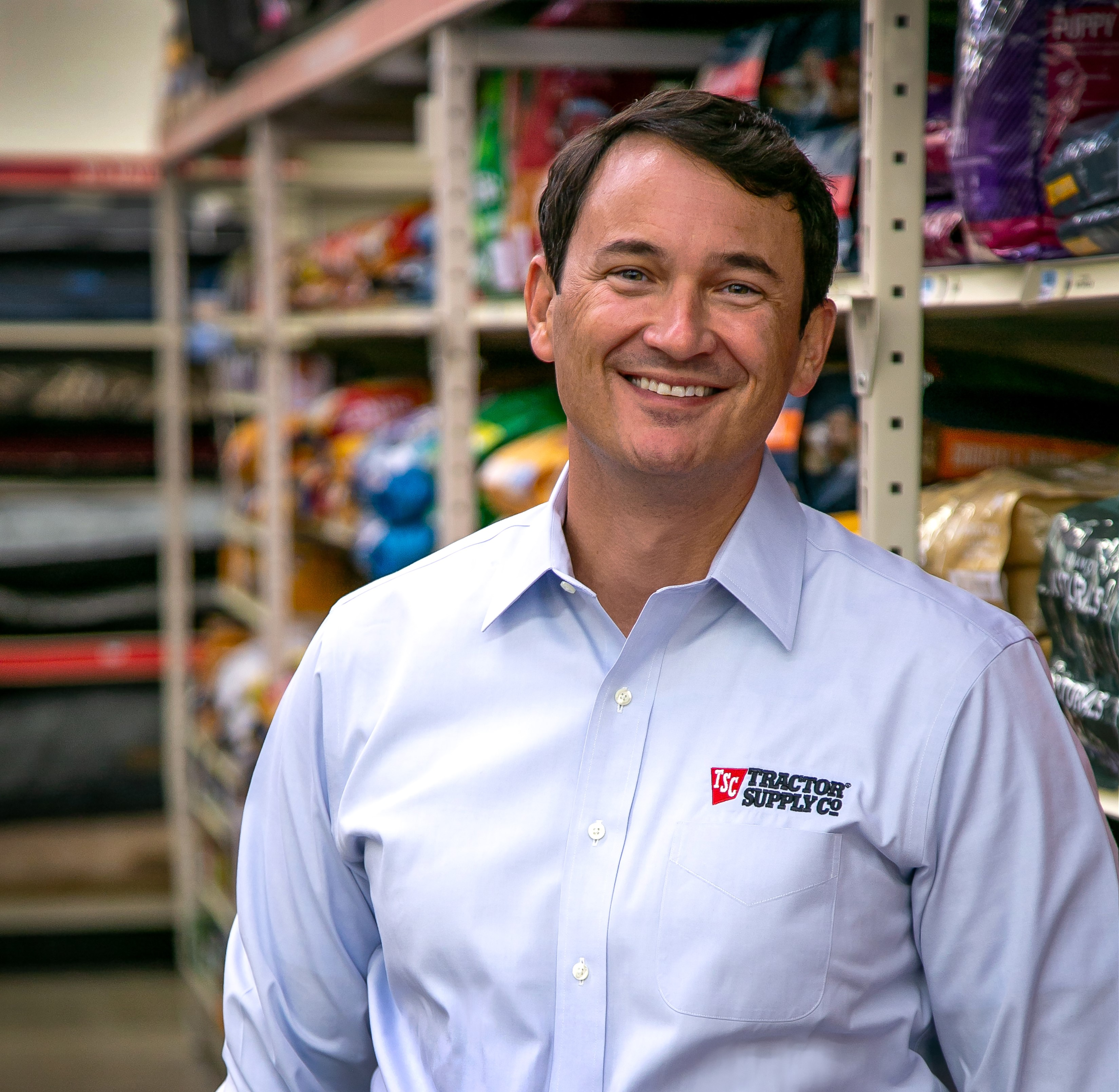
Hal Lawton of Tractor Supply (2020)

=== Agriculture ===
- American Farm Bureau Federation – Zippy Duvall
- Sysco Corporation – Kevin Hourican
- Tyson Foods, Inc. – Dean Banks
- Perdue Farms, Inc. – Randy Day
- Cargill, Inc. – David MacLennan
- Archer-Daniels-Midland Company – Juan Luciano
- Corteva Agriscience – Jim Collins
- Tractor Supply Company – Hal Lawton
- Seaboard Corporation – Steven Bresky
- Grimmway Farms – Barbara Grimm
- Mountaire Farms – Ronnie Cameron

=== Banking ===
- Bank of America – Brian Moynihan
- JPMorgan Chase – Jamie Dimon
- Goldman Sachs – David Solomon
- Citigroup – Michael Corbat
- Wells Fargo – Charles Scharf
- U.S. Bancorp – Andrew Cecere
- Morgan Stanley – James Gorman
- Grand Rapids State Bank – Noah Wilcox
- Southern Bancorp – Darrin Williams

=== Construction, Labor, and Workforce ===
- International Union of Operating Engineers – Jim Callahan
- North America's Building Trades Unions – Sean McGarvey
- Laborers' International Union of North America – Terry O'Sullivan
- International Brotherhood of Teamsters – Jim Hoffa
- National Electrical Contractors Association – David Long
- Bechtel – Brendan Bechtel
- Fluor – Carlos Hernandez
- National Association of Home Builders – Jerry Howard
- Associated Builders and Contractors – Michael Bellaman
- Associated General Contractors – Stephen Sandherr
- AFL-CIO – Richard Trumka
- GH Palmer – Geoff Palmer
- American Council of Engineering Companies – Linda Bauer Darr

=== Defense ===
- Lockheed Martin – Marillyn Hewson
- Honeywell – Darius Adamczyk
- Northrop Grumman – Kathy Warden
- Raytheon – Gregory J. Hayes
- General Dynamics – Phebe Novakovic

=== Energy ===
- ExxonMobil – Darren Woods
- Continental Resources – Harold Hamm
- Chevron – Mike Wirth
- Southern Company – Tom Fanning
- Alabama Power – Mark Crosswhite
- ConocoPhillips – Ryan Lance
- Occidental Petroleum – Vicki Hollub
- Kinder Morgan – Steven Kean
- Hess Corporation – John Hess
- Perot Group and Hillwood – Ross Perot Jr.
- National Mining Association – Rich Nolan
- Valero – Joseph Gorder

=== Financial Services ===
- Blackstone – Stephen Schwarzman
- Paulson & Co. – John Paulson
- Citadel LLC – Kenneth Griffin
- Elliott Management – Paul Singer
- Vista Equity Partners – Robert Smith
- Fidelity Investments – Abigail Johnson
- Mastercard – Ajay Banga
- Visa – Alfred F. Kelly Jr.
- Chubb – Evan Greenberg
- Sequoia Capital – Doug Leone
- Stephens Inc. – Warren Stephens
- Charles Schwab – Chuck Schwab
- FIS Global – Gary Norcross
- TD Ameritrade – Todd Ricketts
- Intuit – Sasan Goodarzi

=== Food and Beverage ===
- National Restaurant Association – Marvin Irby
- McDonald's – Chris Kempczinski
- Darden Restaurants – Gene Lee Jr.
- Coca-Cola – James Quincey
- PepsiCo – Ramon Laguarta
- Chick-fil-A – Dan Cathy
- Subway – John Chidsey
- Bloomin' Brands – David Deno
- Yum! Brands – David Gibbs
- Papa Johns – Rob Lynch
- Wendy's – Todd Penegor
- Waffle House – Walt Ehmer
- Starbucks – Kevin Johnson
- Wolfgang Puck
- Thomas Keller
- Jean-Georges Vongerichten
- Daniel Boulud
- M Crowd Restaurant – Ray Washburne
- Jimmy John's – Jimmy John Liautaud
- Kraft – Carlos Abrams-Rivera
- National Association of Wholesaler-Distributors – Dirk Van Dongen
- International Franchise Association – Robert Cresanti
- Inspire Brands – Paul Brown

=== Healthcare ===
- NewYork-Presbyterian Hospital – Jerry Speyer
- HCA Healthcare – Sam Hazen
- Ascension Health – Joseph R. Impicciche
- CommonSpirit Health – Lloyd H. Dean
- Community Health Systems – Wayne Smith
- Trinity Health – Benjamin Carter
- Cardinal Health – Mike Kaufmann
- McKesson – Brian Tyler
- 3M – Mike Roman
- Procter & Gamble – David S. Taylor
- Abbott Laboratories – Robert Ford
- Johnson & Johnson – Alex Gorsky
- Merck – Kenneth Frazier
- Pfizer – Albert Bourla
- Eli Lilly and Company – Dave Ricks
- Thermo Fisher Scientific – Marc Casper
- Gilead Sciences – Daniel O’Day
- AbbVie – Richard Gonzalez
- Regeneron – Leo Schleifer
- Biogen – Michel Vounatsos
- Roche Diagnostics – Matthew Sause
- Anthem – Gail Boudreaux
- UnitedHealth Group – David Wichmann
- Aetna – Karen Lynch
- Cigna – David Cordani
- Humana – Bruce Broussard
- Centene – Michael Neidorff

=== Hospitality ===
- Las Vegas Sands – Sheldon Adelson
- Marriott – Arne Sorenson
- Carnival – Micky Arison
- Hilton – Christopher Nassetta
- Hyatt – Mark Hoplamazian
- Wyndham Hotels & Resorts – Geoff Ballotti
- Intercontinental Hotels Group – Elie Maalouf
- Royal Caribbean – Richard Fain
- Norwegian Cruise Lines – Frank Del Rio
- Treasure Island Hotels – Phil Ruffin

=== Manufacturing ===
- Caterpillar – Jim Umpleby III
- Deere & Company – John May
- Cummins – Tom Linebarger
- Dow Inc. – Jim Fitterling
- Emerson Electric Company – David Farr
- General Electric – Larry Culp
- Tesla – Elon Musk
- Fiat Chrysler Automobiles – Mike Manley
- Ford Motor Company – Bill Ford
- General Motors Company – Mary Barra
- National Association of Manufacturers – Jay Timmons
- Pernod Ricard – Ann Mukherjee
- Nucor – Leon Topalian

=== Real Estate ===
- Simon Property Group – David Simon
- Caruso – Rick Caruso
- Vornado Realty Trust – Steven Roth
- Related Companies – Stephen Ross
- Blackstone – Jon Gray
- Irvine Company – Don Bren
- Starwood Capital Group – Barry Sternlicht
- Witkoff Group – Steve Witkoff
- Greystar – Bob Faith

=== Retail ===
- Walmart – Doug McMillon
- Home Depot – Craig Menear
- Home Depot – Ken Langone
- Home Depot – Bernie Marcus
- The Kroger Co. – Rodney McMullen
- Lowe's – Marvin Ellison
- Target – Brian Cornell
- CVS Health – Larry Merlo
- Rite Aid – Heyward Donigan
- Walgreens – Stefano Pessina
- Amazon – Jeff Bezos
- Menards – John Menard
- Best Buy – Hubert Joly
- Life Time Fitness – Bahram Akradi
- National Retail Federation – Matthew Shay

=== Technology ===
- Apple – Tim Cook
- Google (Alphabet Inc.) – Sundar Pichai
- Oracle – Larry Ellison
- Oracle – Safra Catz
- Salesforce – Marc Benioff
- SAP – Jen Morgan
- Microsoft – Satya Nadella
- Facebook – Mark Zuckerberg
- IBM – Arvind Krishna
- Intel – Bob Swan
- Qualcomm – Steven Mollenkopf
- Cisco – Chuck Robbins
- Advanced Micro Devices – Lisa Su
- Broadcom – Hock Tan
- Micron – Sanjay Mehrotra

=== Telecommunications ===
- Liberty Media – John Malone
- Verizon – Hans Vestberg
- T-Mobile – Mike Sievert
- Charter Communications – Tom Rutledge
- Comcast – Brian Roberts
- Altec – Lee Styslinger

=== Transportation ===
- FedEx – Fred Smith
- United Airlines – Oscar Munoz
- UPS – David Abney
- J. B. Hunt – John Roberts III
- YRC Worldwide – Darren Hawkins
- Crowley Maritime – Tom Crowley
- Uber – Dara Khosrowshahi
- DHL – Mike Parra
- LDJ Global Strategies – Louis DeJoy
- American Trucking Associations – Chris Spear

=== Sports ===
- NBA – Adam Silver
- MLB – Rob Manfred
- NFL – Roger Goodell
- UFC – Dana White
- PGA – Jay Monahan
- LPGA – Mike Whan
- USTA – Patrick Galbraith
- MLS – Don Garber
- WWE – Vince McMahon
- NASCAR – Lesa Kennedy
- NHL – Gary Bettman
- New England Patriots – Bob Kraft
- Dallas Cowboys – Jerry Jones
- Dallas Mavericks – Mark Cuban
- WNBA – Cathy Engelbert
- NWSL – Lisa Baird

=== Thought Leaders ===
- John Allison
- Kay Coles James
- Condoleezza Rice
- Art Laffer
- Steve Moore
- Steve Forbes
- Larry Lindsey
- Catherine Reynolds
- Jim DeMint
- Bill Hagerty
- Scott Gottlieb
