= AvalonBay Communities =

Former American real estate company

AvalonBay Communities, Inc.
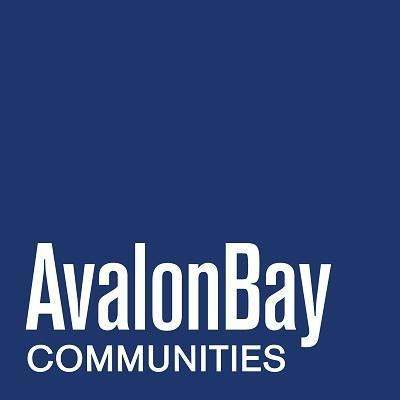

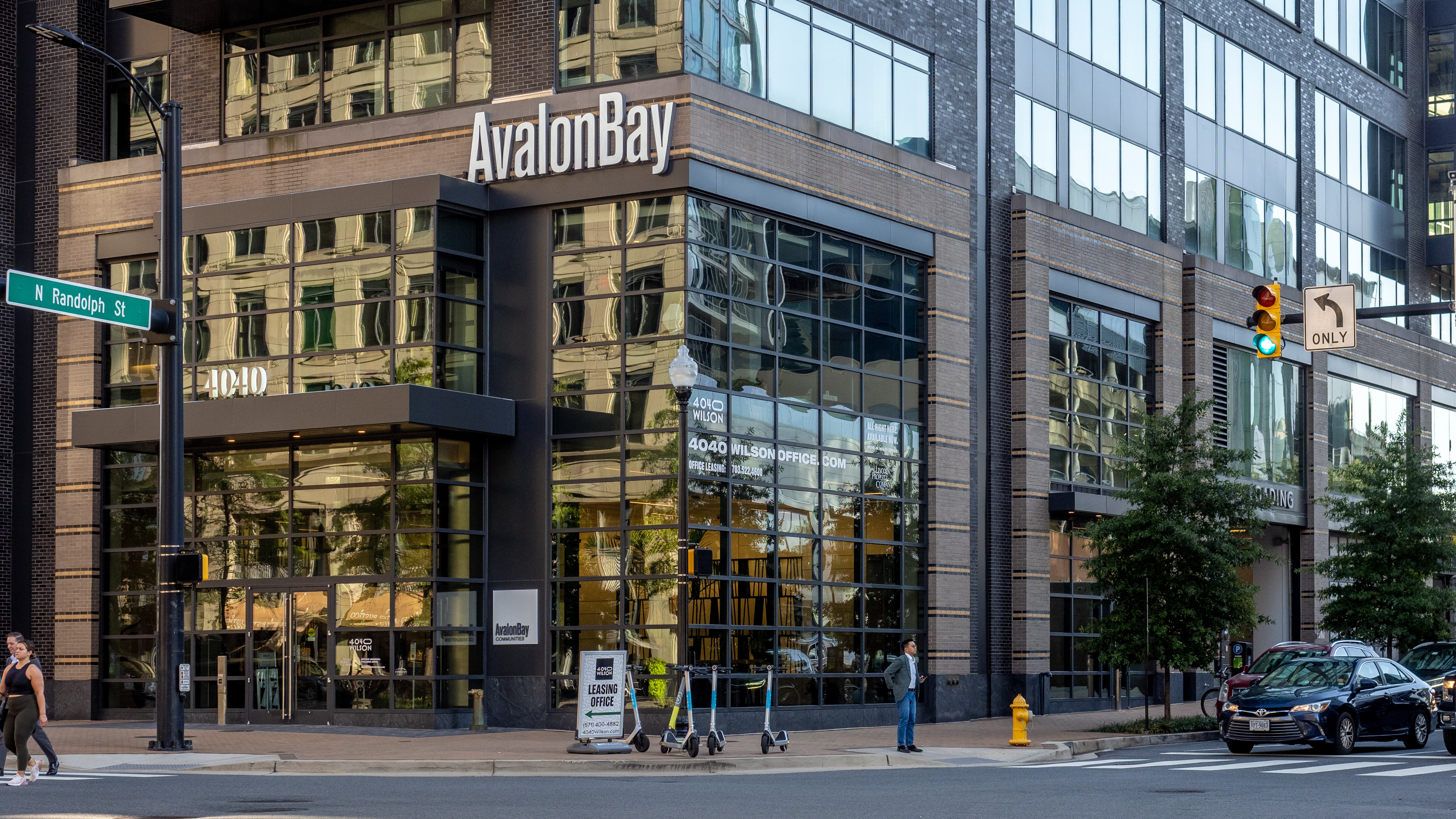
- Headquarters in Arlington, VA (2022)
- Traded as: NYSE: AVB
- Industry: Real estate investment trust
- Predecessor: Avalon Properties Inc. Bay Apartment Communities, Inc.
- Founded: 1978; 48 years ago
- Defunct: August 18, 2026; 51 days ago
- Fate: Merged with Equity Residential to form Vivmark Residential
- Headquarters: Arlington County, Virginia, U.S.
- Key people: Timothy J. Naughton (chairman); Benjamin Schall (CEO); Kevin P. O’Shea (CFO)
- Revenue: ▲US$3.040 billion (2025)
- Operating income: 1,765,786,000 United States dollar (2022)
- Net income: ▼US$1.056 billion (2025)
- Total assets: ▲US$22.192 billion (2025)
- Total equity: ▼US$11.611 billion (2025)
- Number of employees: 3,041 (2026)

AvalonBay Communities, Inc. was a publicly traded real estate investment trust that invested in apartments. In August 2026, the company merged with Equity Residential to form Vivmark Residential.

As of January 31, 2026, AvalonBay owned or held an interest in 292 apartment communities containing 88,768 apartment homes, with 27 additional communities under development, in New England, the New York City metropolitan area, the Washington, D.C. metropolitan area, Seattle, and California. It was the 3rd largest owner of apartments in the United States.

== History ==
The company was formed by the 1998 merger between Avalon Properties Inc. and Bay Apartment Communities Inc. The merged company owned 40,506 apartment units. Avalon Properties was formed in 1993 as a spinoff from Trammell Crow Company and was led by Richard Michaux, as chairman and CEO, and Chuck Berman, president, COO, and board member. Bay Apartment Communities was formed in 1994 from the apartment business established by Mike Meyer in 1978.

In February 2013, the company and Equity Residential closed a $9 billion deal to acquire Archstone from Lehman Brothers.

In August 2026, the company was acquired by Vivmark Residential.

=== CEO history ===
In February 2001, Bryce Blair was named CEO, and the additional role of chairman in January 2002.

In 2011, Timothy J. Naughton was named CEO, and the additional role of chairman in January 2013.

In 2021, Benjamin Schall was named CEO.

== Legal issues ==
In 2017, a class action lawsuit was filed by former tenants of Avalon at Edgewater, an AvalonBay community in Edgewater, New Jersey, who alleged that AvalonBay breached its duty of care by allegedly violating fire standards and safety procedures following a five-alarm fire at the community in 2015. The lawsuit was settled in July 2017.

In March 2025, a federal lawsuit filed by a tenant in New Jersey alleged a "bait-and-switch" scheme in which the company lures tenants with market-rate rents but later charges them substantial, undisclosed "Renewal Premiums" above market rate when they renew their leases, exploiting the inconvenience of moving. In October 2025, the court granted in part and denied in part AvalonBay's motion to dismiss, allowing core parts of the case to move forward.

In a multi-district class action lawsuit, the company and 10 other large landlords were accused of engaging in an unlawful conspiracy to use RealPage's revenue management software to share competitively sensitive data and coordinate rent increases.

In June 2025, the Equal Rights Center (ERC) sued the company for illegal discrimination under D.C. law, claiming that since at least 2020, the company's AVA NoMa property falsely listed windowless rooms as bedrooms. As D.C. housing code requires bedrooms to have a window, and the local housing voucher program requires units to pass an inspection, this practice allegedly made a significant portion of the building's units—including 100% of its advertised three-bedroom units—unavailable to tenants using housing vouchers.
