= Sullivan Central High School =

Location
- 131 Shipley Ferry Rd; Blountville, Tennessee 37617; United States; 36°31′52.5″N 82°23′13.7″W

Information
- School type: Public, high school
- Founded: 1968
- School district: Sullivan County Schools
- Faculty: 59.50 (FTE)
- Grades: 9–12
- Enrollment: 850 (2018–19)
- Student to teacher ratio: 14.29
- Language: English
- Colors: White and Orange
- Mascot: Cougars
- Feeder schools: Blountville Middle School, Holston Middle School

Sullivan Central High School was a public high school (grades 9–12) located in Blountville, Tennessee under the authority of Sullivan County Schools. It served students from Blountville Middle School and Holston Middle School until it was incorporated into the new West Ridge High School in 2021. The school's mascot was the cougar, and its final principal was Mark Foster before the school's facilities transitioned into Central Middle School following the formation of West Ridge High.

== History ==
The school opened in 1968 with its main building and eventually expanded with a classroom addition and vocational building in 1978. A football fieldhouse was later opened in the fall of 1997.

At 9:15 AM on August 30, 2010, 62-year-old Kingsport resident Thomas Richard Cowan brought two loaded guns to the school and threatened then-principal Melanie Riden and school resource officer Carolyn Gudger, who escorted Riden to safety. Cowan was shot by police officers and died at 10:10 AM.

== Athletics ==
The school had athletic teams in all traditional varsity sports, including football, swimming, soccer, basketball, track, cross country, tennis, baseball, softball, volleyball, cheerleading, and marching band. Despite its relatively small enrollment, the school fielded three men's basketball teams and two to three women's basketball teams in the same divisions. The school maintained intense rivalries with the other three Sullivan County high schools and in select sports with the local city schools of Dobyns Bennett High School, Tennessee High School, and Science Hill High School.

The heat to the Sullivan Central swimming pool went out in mid-December 2008 after the school's coal-fired hot-water boiler was replaced with three on-demand domestic water heaters that were unable to service the pool. The swim team practiced at sister school Sullivan North High School until it was reopened in January 2011, when the pool was dedicated to Bradley Brock, a senior who died of cancer in September 2010.
