= Starwood =

Starwood may refer to:

- Starwood (nightclub), a former music venue in West Hollywood, California
- Starwood Amphitheatre, a former outdoor music venue in the Nashville, Tennessee area
- Starwood Capital Group, an American private investment firm
- Starwood Festival, an annual Neo-Pagan, New Age, multi-cultural and world music festival
- Starwood Hotels and Resorts, an American hotel and leisure company acquired by Marriott in 2016.
- Starwood Hotels (2008-)
