= Starwood Hotels =

Starwood Hotels may refer to:

- Starwood Hotels and Resorts
- Starwood Hotels (2008-)
