= Hal Lawton =

American businessman

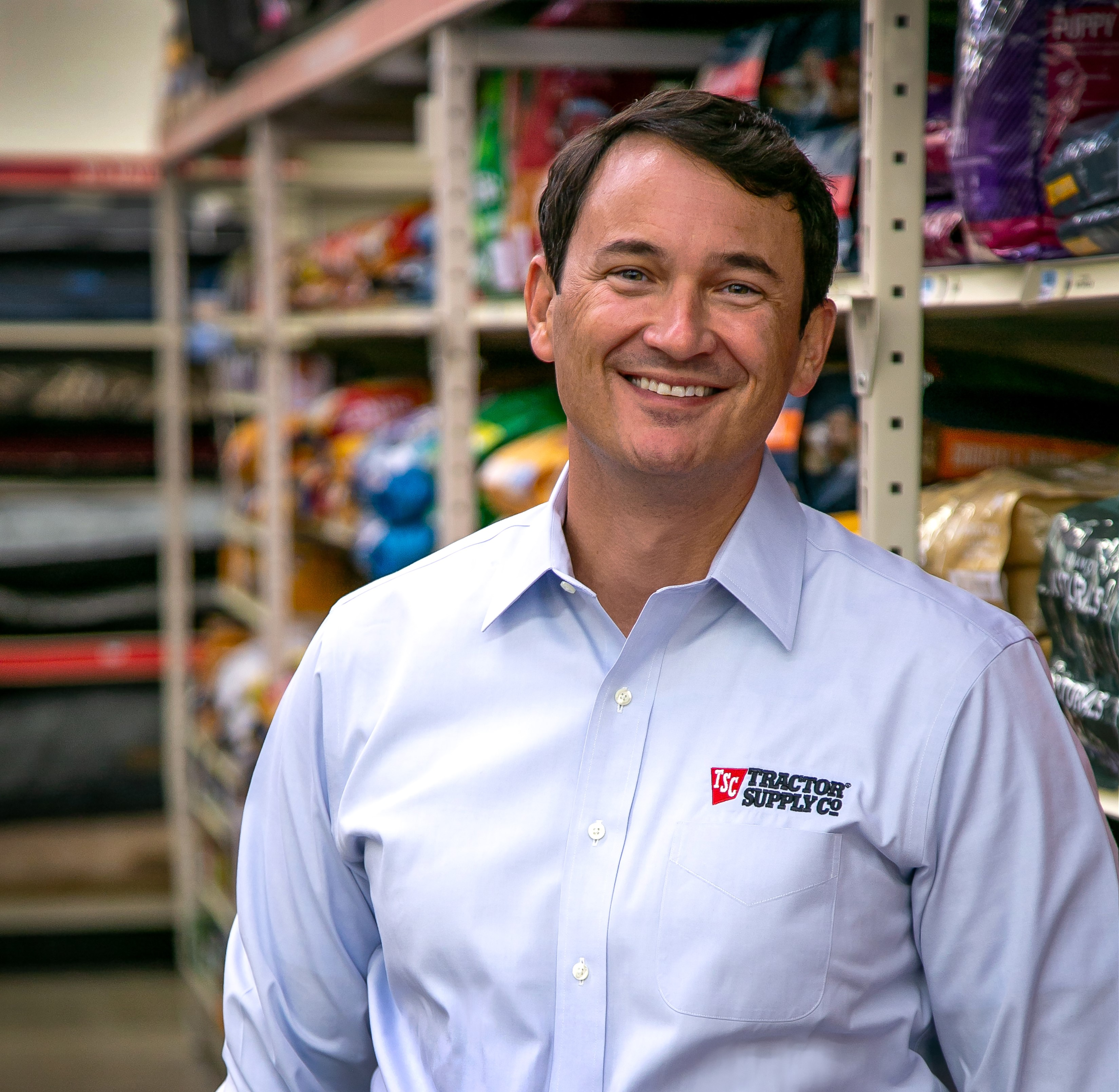
- Lawton in 2020
- Born: Harry A. Lawton III; 4 July 1974 (age 52); Kingsport, Tennessee, United States
- Education: North Carolina State University (BS); University of Virginia (MBA)
- Known for: CEO at Tractor Supply Company, former president of Macy's
- Spouse: Jody
- Children: 3

Harry A. Lawton III (born July 4, 1974) is an American businessman. He is president and chief executive officer of the retailer Tractor Supply Company. He is also a member of the company's board. He was formerly president of Macy's.

== Early life and education ==
Lawton was born in Kingsport, Tennessee in 1974. He attended Sullivan South High School. His father worked at Eastman Chemical Company. As a child, Lawton played basketball at the Boys and Girls Club, delivered papers for the Kingsport Times-News, and attended St. Paul’s Episcopal Church.

Lawton holds an undergraduate degree in chemical engineering and another in pulp and paper science technology from North Carolina State University, where he was a Caldwell Fellow. He holds a master of business administration from University of Virginia Darden School of Business, where he was given the William Michael Shermet Award.

== Career ==
Lawton started his career in a paper mill in rural North Carolina. In 2000, he joined McKinsey & Co. and was an associate principal until 2005. From 2005 to 2015, Lawton held different positions at The Home Depot, including President Online and SVP Merchandising. From August 2015 to September 2017, Lawton was the SVP of eBay North America. From September 2017 to December 2019, he served as the president for Macy's.

In January 2020, Lawton returned to Tennessee and began work as the chief executive officer and president of Tractor Supply Company. He is a member of the company's board of directors. During Lawton’s first year as CEO, more people began gardening and owning pets and livestock due to the COVID-19 pandemic and Tractor Supply Company saw revenue growth of 27 percent. In 2022, Tractor Supply reached #294 on the Fortune 500 list. In February 2023, Tractor Supply extended the terms of Lawton’s contract for another three years, to 2026, with an evergreen extension going forward.

Lawton serves on the board of directors of Sealed Air Corporation located in Charlotte, North Carolina and previously served on the board of Buffalo Wild Wings.

As of 2022, was a member National Retail Federation board of directors. He was a member of the Great American Economic Revival Industry Groups.

Lawton is a member of the Nashville Area Chamber of Commerce, chairing its Talent Solutions Council. He is also a member of The Business Council.

== Personal life ==
Lawton lives with his wife, Jodie, in Nashville, Tennessee. They have three children.

== Recognition ==
Lawton was named to the list of "Most Admired CEOs" for 2023 by the Nashville Business Journal.
