= Four Pillars Hotels =

British hotel chain

- Type: Subsidiary
- Industry: Hospitality
- Founded: 1974
- Headquarters: Harrogate, England
- Area served: United Kingdom
- Key people: Tony Troy, CEO
- Parent: Starwood Capital Group
- Website: www.phcompany.com

Four Pillars Hotels was a hotel chain operating in the United Kingdom. The group had six hotels, situated in Oxford, the Cotswolds and the Thames Valley, operating in the three and four star sector. In 2014 the company was acquired by American Starwood Capital Group for around £90 million.

== History ==
Founded in 1974, the hotel group had six hotels, the last of which, the Cotswold Water Park Hotel, near Cirencester, opened in 2007. Following the company's purchase by Starwood Capital in January 2014, Four Pillars has been added to other UK acquisitions Principal Hayley Group and De Vere Group. After a major rebranding project, the Four Pillars Hotels brand was retired and the hotels were amalgamated into other brands.

== Facilities ==
Four Pillars hotels featured restaurant and bars, spa treatments, swimming pools and fully equipped gyms in all hotels. Some hotels also had self-catering apartments.
