= Tony Fabrizio =

American Republican pollster and strategist

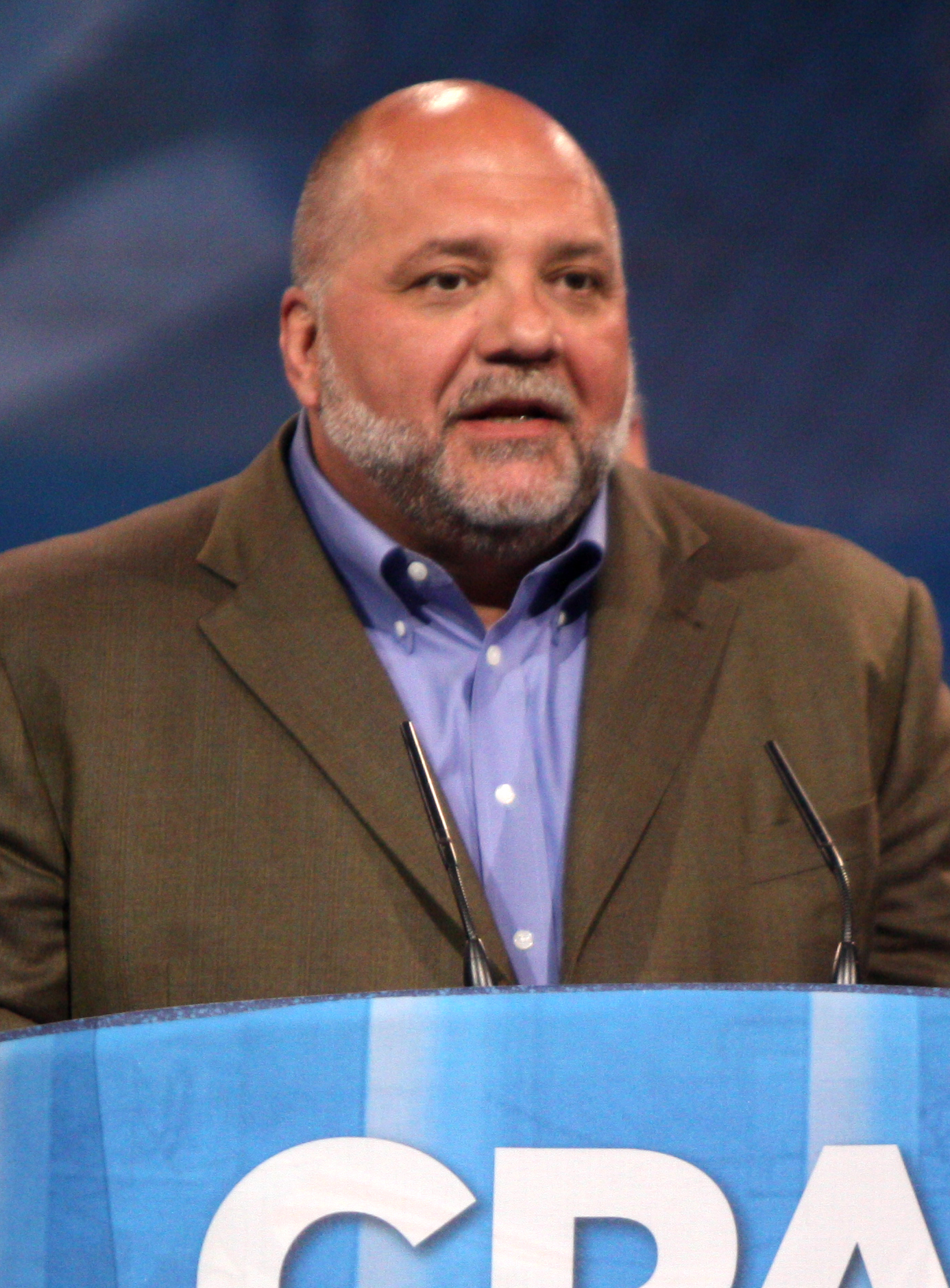
- Fabrizio in 2013
- Born: Anthony Fabrizio; 1960 (age 65–66); New York City, U.S.
- Education: Long Island University
- Political party: Republican
- Website: Official website

Anthony Fabrizio (born 1960) is an American pollster and strategist for the Republican Party. The principal in Fabrizio, Lee & Associates, Fabrizio was the pollster for Donald Trump's 2016 presidential campaign and 2024 presidential campaign, former Senator Bob Dole's 1996 presidential campaign, U.S. Senator Rand Paul's U.S. Senate and 2016 presidential campaign, and former Governor Rick Perry's 2012 presidential campaign, among others. He also served as a pollster for the U.S. Chamber of Commerce in the 2014 midterm elections.

Fabrizio is a silent owner of Multi Media Services Corporation (MMSC). MMSC was the biggest vendor to a major pro-Trump Rebuilding America Now super PAC.

In February 2018, he was questioned by Robert Mueller's Special Counsel team about polling data shared with pro-Kremlin pro-Putin individuals.

== Career ==
In 1996, Fabrizio served as chief pollster and strategist to Bob Dole's Presidential campaign, which was unsuccessful. He has also worked for several dozen U.S. Senators and Governors, including Tim Pawlenty, Rand Paul, Bill Cassidy, David Perdue, among others. During 2012 and 2013, he received $250,000 for his efforts to assist Paul Manafort's pro-Russia, pro-Kremlin, pro-Putin efforts in Ukraine. (Note: From 2011 to 2013 with liaison to Serhiy Lyovochkin, Alan Friedman, Eckart Sager, who was a one time CNN producer, Rick Gates, Paul Manafort, and Manafort's senior aide Konstantin Kilimnik devised a strategy to discredit Yulia Tymoshenko along with Hillary Clinton who had been an outspoken critic of pro-Russia, pro-Kremlin, and pro-Putin supporters in Ukraine. Manafort's Global Endeavour Inc., a St. Vincent and Grenadines based consulting and lobbying company, his Lucicle Consultants Ltd., a Cyprus based consulting company, and three other of his companies were hired to provide support to Viktor Yanukovych and his Party of Regions. This strategy included: creating a fake think tank in Vienna, the Center for the Study of Former Soviet Socialist Republics (CXSSR), to support Yanukovich and his Party of Regions; using a social media blitz with Twitter, YouTube, and Facebook, and altering the Google's search stack to disseminate articles and videos that undermine opponents of the Party of Regions and Yanukovich in Europe and the United States; rewriting wikipedia articles to smear Yanukovich opponents especially Tymoshenko; and using Breitbart News, RedState, and an article in The Wall Street Journal to discredit the Obama State Department and the United States Secretary of State Hillary Clinton. Alan Friedman, who had not registered as a foreign agent in the United States, told Kostyantyn Gryshchenko that Friedman, who often wrote using the pen name Matthew Lina, published dozens of positive stories about the Party of Regions and Yanukovich and ensured that these were disseminated to over 2,000 publications and placed at the top of Google search stacks. Known as the Tymoshenko Files, Friedman sent Manafort a highly confidential two page letter detailing Friedman's efforts and that Friedman would claim to be Inna Bohoslovska to ghost pen articles on her behalf. In October 2012 after Hillary Clinton had supported Tymoshenko, Brietbart News released an article calling Hillary Clinton a “neo-Nazi Frankenstein”.) He was also pollster for the Republican Governor Association's campaign to reelect Governor Scott Walker in 2014. He also served as the pollster for the U.S. Chamber of Commerce's independent campaign effort that helped elect six new Republican Senators and re-elect three Republican incumbents in 2014.

In 2015, he served as pollster for successful gubernatorial candidate Matt Bevin in Kentucky, and that year also aided Rand Paul's Presidential campaign. Following Paul's exit from the race, Fabrizio was hired by the campaign of Donald Trump as Chief Pollster, joining fellow pollsters Kellyanne Conway and John McLaughlin (Fabrizio's former business partner). Fabrizio's hiring as Trump's pollster came as a surprise to political analysts, pointing to Trump's past opposition to pollsters, with Trump stating in an interview with Chuck Todd on Meet the Press, "I don't have pollsters. I don't want to waste money on pollsters. I don't want to be unreal. I want to be me. I have to be me." He and Conway were among those representing the Trump campaign at Harvard University's post-election roundtable. Fabrizio is also longtime friends with former Trump advisers Paul Manafort and Roger Stone.

In October 2016, it was reported in multiple media outlets that Trump was refusing to pay for Fabrizio's polling services, with the Federal Election Commission report showing that Trump's campaign was disputing nearly $767,000 (~$979,674 in 2024) that Fabrizio's firm said it was still owed for polling.

Fabrizio has additionally worked with clients including Visa, Hewlett-Packard, Bank of America, AOL/Time-Warner, FedEx, Pfizer, and Harrah's, among others.

As of 2023, Fabrizio was running polling operations for Trumps MAGA Inc. super PAC.

In February 2026, it was reported he joined former Israeli Prime Minister Naftali Bennett's campaign team for the 2026 Israeli elections.

== Mueller's Special Counsel investigations ==
In February 2018, Fabrizio was questioned by Robert Mueller's team to determine if voter information and polling data was shared with the Kremlin during the 2016 United States elections. On January 8, 2019, Paul Manafort's attorneys failed to redact and inadvertently revealed that Mueller's prosecutors knew that 2016 voter information and polling data had been shared with pro-Kremlin Ukrainians through Konstantin Kilimnik to Serhiy Lyovochkin and Rinat Akhmetov.

== Personal life ==
Fabrizio is a Brooklyn native, and grew up on Long Island in New York. He resides in Florida. He is openly gay.

== See also ==
- Timeline of investigations into Donald Trump and Russia
