= Sullivan North High School =

Location
- Kingsport, Tennessee; United States; 36°33′37.8″N 82°30′3.9″W

Information
- Type: Public
- Motto: Today can be a great day for you if you want it to be
- Established: 1980
- Oversight: Sullivan County Schools
- Faculty: 38.00 (FTE)
- Grades: 9–12
- Enrollment: 440 (2018-19)
- Student to teacher ratio: 11.58
- Colors: Black and gold
- Mascot: Raider
- Rivals: Sullivan South, Elizabethton, Sullivan East
- Newspaper: Raider Wrap
- Feeder schools: Ketron Elementary School, Sullivan North Middle School
- Website: snhs-scde-tn.schoolloop.com

Sullivan North High School was a public high school (grades 9–12) located in Kingsport, Tennessee under the authority of Sullivan County Schools. Opened in 1980, the school had a student body of approximately 1500 students. However, due to declining enrollment partly from annexation by the city of Kingsport, enrollment was reduced to approximately 600 students at the time of amalgamation into West Ridge High School in 2021. Sullivan North's former facilities were designated by Kingsport City to be John Sevier Middle School's new campus until 2022 when the facility became the Tribe Athletic Complex, which held middle school and youth league games and practices. The Dobyns-Bennett basketball team had its season in the former Sullivan North gym due to roof problems with the Buck Van Huss dome.

== Academics ==
Sullivan North used a modified block schedule with four 60- to 80-minute periods and one 45-minute class each day. It offered several "accelerated", AP, and technical/vocational courses, including computer-aided design, carpentry, culinary arts, and criminal justice. It participated in a program with Northeast State Community College allowing seniors to take classes for both high school and college credit in the areas of advanced English and humanities/public speaking.

== Extracurriculars ==
Sullivan North High School had athletics programs for basketball, baseball, cheerleading, cross country, football, golf, softball, tennis, track and field, volleyball.
