= West Ridge High School =

Location
- 380 Lynn Rd; Blountville, Tennessee 37617; United States
- 36.5127°N 82.4218°W

Information
- Type: Public
- Established: 2021
- School district: Sullivan County Schools
- Principal: George Laoo
- Teaching staff: 122.37 (FTE)
- Grades: 9–12
- Enrollment: 1,683 (2022–23)
- Student to teacher ratio: 13.75
- Campus type: Rural
- Colors: Royal blue and grey
- Mascot: Wolves
- Newspaper: The Howler
- Feeder schools: Sullivan Heights Middle School, Sullivan Central Middle School
- Website: wrhs.sullivank12.net

West Ridge High School is a public high school (grades 9–12) located in Blountville, Tennessee which operates under the administration of Sullivan County Schools. It was founded as a merger of Sullivan South High School, Sullivan North High School, and Sullivan Central High School in 2021. Dr. Josh Davis was announced as principal in July 2020 and remained the school's principal until leaving in June 2023. In June 2023, it was announced that George Laoo would become the school's new principal and has been the principal since the start of the 2023-2024 school year in August 2023

== History ==
West Ridge High School officially opened in 2021, becoming the first new public high school to be opened in Sullivan County since the formation of the Sullivan North and Sullivan South high schools in 1980. The construction of the campus, which spans over 300,000 square feet and is known as the Ridge, cost about $75 million. The construction of the new campus accompanied the closure of the Sullivan North and South high schools as well as Sullivan Central High School and accommodated students from those schools. The opening of the school was intended for August 2020, but though construction persisted in spite of the COVID-19 pandemic, it was nonetheless delayed for a year due to rain.
