= Geoffrey Palmer (real estate developer) =

American real estate developer

Geoff Palmer
- Born: Geoffrey Harrison Palmer; May 11, 1950 (age 76); Los Angeles County, California, U.S.
- Education: University of Colorado, Boulder, Pepperdine University
- Occupation: Real estate developer
- Spouse: Anne Emerich
- Children: 1

Geoffrey Harrison Palmer (born May 11, 1950) is an American billionaire real estate developer and major political donor to the Republican Party.

== Early life and education ==
Palmer is the son of architect and developer Daniel Saxon Palmer, who was born as Dan Weissinger in Budapest, Hungary, in 1920. He is of Jewish descent. He was raised in Malibu, California. Palmer attended Santa Monica College before transferring to the University of Colorado at Boulder, where he earned a degree in finance. Palmer then earned a juris doctor from Pepperdine School of Law.

== Career ==
After clerking for a California superior court judge, Palmer decided to pursue real estate development of multifamily housing instead of law as a profession, founding GH Palmer Associates in 1978. Palmer opened his first major development in Santa Clarita, California in 1985. During the 1990s, Palmer focused on building more than 2000 market-rate housing in downtown Los Angeles and its suburbs.

In 2001, Palmer completed the 632-unit Medici, the first of a series of downtown Italian-inspired apartment blocks situated beside freeways, which coincided with a revival of downtown Los Angeles. Other buildings in the "Renaissance Collection" built by Palmer include the Orsini, Visconti, Piero, Da Vinci, and Lorenzo.

In 2006, Palmer applied for the Piero II, a mixed-use project, and requested that the City waive the affordable housing requirements. The City denied the waiver and Palmer sued it (Palmer/Sixth Street Properties LP v. City of Los Angeles), claiming the City's affordable housing zoning requirements in the Central City West specific plan violated the Costa-Hawkins Act. In 2009, the California Court of Appeal ruled that "as applied to Palmer's proposed project, the affordable housing ordinance conflicts with and is preempted by the vacancy decontrol provisions of the Costa-Hawkins Rental Housing Act."

The City later sued Palmer for negligence after another development, the Da Vinci, intentionally set fire by an arsonist currently in jail, damaged the adjacent freeway and a nearby city government building, eventually settling the case for $400,000.

Palmer's most recent building, Broadway Palace Apartments, was completed in early 2017. Broadway Palace Apartments is designed in the Beaux-Arts style with a plaster and cast concrete ground level and top story, separated from the terracotta brick middle stories by string courses, moldings and changes in materials. Notable features include arched openings along the top story, dentils, brackets, pilasters and capitals. The facade fenestration and articulation resembles the historic 1920s-era buildings located on Broadway but different enough to appear new.

Palmer has clashed with local government officials and activists, in part due to criticism of the style of his apartment buildings. Councilman Ed Reyes also criticized Palmer for the accidental destruction of an 1887 Victorian-style building. In 2015, Eddie Kim of the Los Angeles Downtown News described Palmer as both the "most prolific" and "most controversial" developer in downtown Los Angeles.

Palmer, a strong opponent of mandatory affordable housing requirements for real estate development, appears in the Paradise Papers in connection with a Bermuda offshore company to hold the registration for his private jet, which is done for security and maintenance reasons, yet he still pays the required California assesses property taxes on aircraft, which Bermuda does not.

Palmer is worth an estimated US$3 billion.

== Political activities ==
In 1991, Palmer paid an administrative $30,000 fine after being accused of money-laundering campaign contributions in order to prevent the incorporation of Santa Clarita. Palmer donated $500,000 to Mitt Romney's 2012 presidential campaign, and $2 million to Rebuilding America Now political action committee (PAC) during Donald Trump's presidential campaign. Palmer has also donated to American Crossroads, the Republican National Committee, and the National Republican Congressional Committee. GH Palmer & Associates contributed $5,005,400 to the 2016 Trump campaign. On September 17, 2019, Palmer hosted a fundraiser with President Trump at Palmer's home.

In 2020, Palmer was selected by President Trump to participate in the Great American Economic Revival Industry Groups. Palmer was a major financier of the 2021 California gubernatorial recall election, contributing $1.2 million to the campaign to recall Gavin Newsom and supporting radio host Larry Elder to replace him.

== Personal life ==
Palmer is married to Anne Emerich, who was born in Paris, and they have a son. In 2016, Palmer and his family were living in Burton E. Green's former residence in Beverly Hills, California, with another property in Saint-Tropez, France. Palmer plays competitive polo.

== Philanthropy ==
He is a trustee of the Los Angeles County Museum of Art (LACMA). He is a contributor to the Pepperdine School of Law and has endowed The Geoffrey H. Palmer Center for Entrepreneurship and the Law.
