= Buildium =

American property software management

- Type: Private company
- Industry: Property management
- Founded: 2004; 22 years ago
- Headquarters: Boston, Massachusetts, United States
- Website: www.buildium.com

Buildium was an American property management software company. It was founded in 2004 and headquartered in Boston, Massachusetts, providing cloud-based (software as a service), real estate software. The property management of its software allows real estate professionals to manage property portfolios, including leasing, accounting and operations.

== History ==
Buildium was co-founded in 2004 by Michael Monteiro and Dimitris Georgakopoulos. The company was bootstrapped for the first eight years, and in 2012 and 2014, Buildium raised two rounds of funding totaling $20 million from K1 Investment Management. In June 2016, the company raised $65M from Sumeru Equity Partners.

In February 2015, Buildium acquired All Property Management, a provider of online marketing services for property managers.

In April 2017, Buildium was named Leader in the Gartner Frontrunners Quadrant for Property Management Software.

In December 2019, Buildium was acquired by RealPage. RealPage previously pegged the value of the Buildium acquisition at $580 million.
