= Rebuilding America Now =

Super PAC supporting Trump 2016 presidential

- Legal status: Terminated

Rebuilding America Now was a political action committee (PAC) created to support Donald Trump's 2016 presidential campaign. A so-called Super PAC, Rebuilding America Now was permitted to raise and spend unlimited amounts of corporate, union, and individual campaign contributions under the terms of the Citizens United Supreme Court decision.

== History ==
Rebuilding America Now was founded in June 2016 by Paul John Manafort, Jr. and Tom Barrack, a real-estate investor and long-time friend of Trump. Manafort tapped Laurance "Laury" Gay, godfather to one of Manafort's daughters, and Ken McKay for senior roles with the Super PAC upon its founding. Though Rebuilding America Now was one of several Super PACs founded to support Trump's bid for the presidency, it was described as the "primary" Super PAC supporting Trump by the New York Times. Vice presidential nominee Mike Pence and Trump campaign manager Paul Manafort both endorsed the Super PAC. Trump himself had previously denigrated the use of Super PACs, but later agreed to headline fundraising events for Rebuilding America Now.

== Embezzlement concerns ==
The committee's treasury was first managed by Colorado lawyer and former state GOP chair Ryan Call, who was later accused of and disbarred for embezzling approximately $280,000 dollars over his tenure at the organization, which lasted from 2016−19. Call was also accused of and later found to have failed to report a $1 million donation by Los Angeles real estate developer Geoffrey Palmer for more than two years after it had been made. Palmer had emerged as the first publicly-disclosed big donor to the group, ultimately donating $4 million to the organization, which raised approximately $23 million in total from June to November 2016.

The PAC reported its status as "terminated" in a 2021-2022 report to the Federal Elections Committee.

== See also ==
- Inauguration of Donald Trump
- Tony Fabrizio
