= The Arboretum of South Barrington =

- Coordinates: 42°04′31″N 88°11′08″W
- Address: 100 W. Higgins Road, South Barrington, IL 60010
- Opened: 2008
- Manager: Heidner Property Management
- Owner: Rick Heidner
- Floor area: 484,000 ft^{2}
- Floors: 1
- Parking: 4064
- Website: www.shopthearb.com

The Arboretum of South Barrington is a shopping center in South Barrington, Illinois, a suburb of Chicago, Illinois, United States. The center is looking to attract retailers. The 600,000-square-foot (56,000 m^{2}) center comprises a mix of apparel and furniture retailers, restaurants, and a movie theater.

== Sale ==
On December 15, 2010, owner Jaffe Cos. announced they were putting the mall up for sale as they were unable to pay off the $91,000,000 construction loan. In 2011, Jaffe Cos. brought in a partner, Long Warf, to pay off the debt. It sold the mall to Starwood Retail Properties.

In 2022, the Arboretum of South Barrington was sold to Hoffman Estates–based Heidner Properties, Inc., led by real estate investor Rick Heidner. The acquisition followed a loan default and foreclosure proceedings involving the previous owner, a venture of Starwood Capital Group. Heidner acquired the property by purchasing the defaulted $67 million loan, gaining control of the 484,000-square-foot open-air shopping center, which became the flagship asset of Heidner Properties’ retail portfolio.

Following the sale, Heidner Properties announced plans for capital improvements, aesthetic upgrades, and enhancements to the tenant mix, with a focus on dining, entertainment, and community-oriented uses. The transaction was completed shortly before the opening of a new Star Cinema Grill theater at the property, replacing the former iPic Theaters location.

== Stores ==
Currently, there are 48 committed retailers and restaurants. Among them are Gold Class Cinemas, L.L.Bean, Pinstripes, and Midwest Elite Gymnastics Academy.
