= Barry Sternlicht =

American businessman (born 1960)

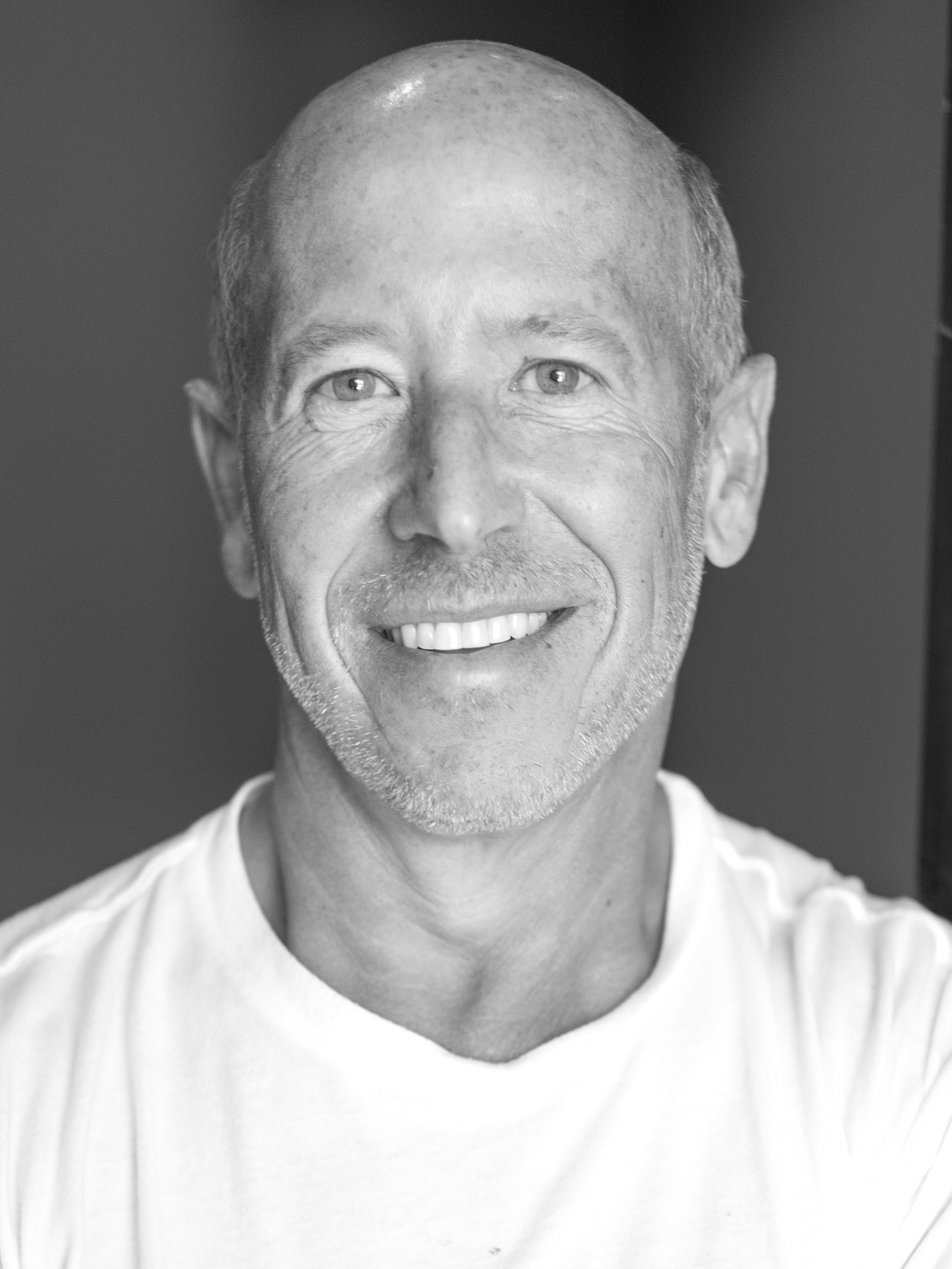
- Born: November 27, 1960 (age 65); New York City, U.S.
- Education: Brown University (BS); Harvard University (MBA)
- Known for: Founder, Starwood Capital Group, Starwood, and W Hotels
- Spouse: Mimi Reichert (1980s–2016)

Barry Stuart Sternlicht (born November 27, 1960) is an American billionaire and the co-founder (with Bob Faith), chairman, and CEO of Starwood Capital Group, an investment fund with over $100 billion in assets under management. He is also chairman of Starwood Property Trust. He is the founder of Starwood Hotels and Resorts Worldwide and was its chairman and CEO from 1995 to 2005. As of May 2023, his net worth was estimated at $4.6 billion.

Sternlicht is on the board of directors of the Estée Lauder Companies, The Business Council, the Real Estate Roundtable, the Robin Hood Foundation, Dreamland Community Theatre, and the Juvenile Diabetes Research Foundation’s National Leadership Advocacy Program. He was on the board of directors of the Pension Real Estate Association, RH (company), Invitation Homes, Tri Pointe Homes, and is a past trustee of his alma mater, Brown University.

Sternlicht's style has been described as "intense and impetuous."

== Early life ==
Sternlicht was born in New York City in 1960 and grew up in Stamford, Connecticut. His father, Maurycy “Mark” Sternlicht, was a plant manager and a Jewish Holocaust survivor from Poland. His mother, Harriet, was from New York and worked as a biology teacher and stockbroker. In 1982, he graduated magna cum laude from Brown University. He then worked as an arbitrage trader on Wall Street. In 1986, he received an MBA (Master of Business Administration) from Harvard Business School.

== Career ==
After graduation, he went to work for JMB Realty, a real estate investment company in Chicago. In 1989, at the start of the savings and loan crisis and the early 1990s recession, he was laid off.

In 1991, at the age of 31, with Bob Faith, Sternlicht launched Starwood Capital Group to buy apartment buildings that were being sold by the Resolution Trust Corporation, created by the federal government to hold and liquidate the real estate assets owned by failed banks after the savings and loan crisis. Sternlicht raised $20 million from the families of William Bernard Ziff Jr. and Carter Burden of New York to fund these purchases.

In 1993, Sternlicht contributed the apartment portfolio to Sam Zell's Equity Residential in exchange for a 20% stake in the company.

In 1994, when Sternlicht was 36, his company purchased Westin Hotels & Resorts in a $561 million transaction in partnership with Goldman Sachs.

In January 1995, Sternlicht purchased Hotel Investors Trust, an almost-bankrupt real estate investment trust, and took over as CEO.

In 1997, Sternlicht's company acquired Sheraton Hotels and Resorts in a $13.3 billion transaction, topping a bid by Hilton Worldwide. Sternlicht's innovations included W Hotels and the Westin Heavenly Bed. The bed was modeled after the bed in Sternlicht's home.

Sternlicht also makes venture investments out of his family office, JAWS Capital - which has also engaged in three separate SPACs.

=== Awards ===
In 1998, Sternlicht received the Golden Plate Award of the American Academy of Achievement.

In 2004, Sternlicht was named "America’s Best Lodging CEO" by Institutional Investor magazine.

In 2005, Sternlicht was inducted into the Interior Design Magazine Hall of Fame.

In 2010, Commercial Property Executive named Sternlicht "Executive of the Year" and "Investor of the Year".

In 2015, Sternlicht received the 2015 Cornell Icon of the Industry Award for his contributions to the hospitality industry, real estate markets and the global business community, as well his philanthropy.

== Personal life ==
Sternlicht met his future wife, Mimi (née Reichert) Sternlicht, while they were both students at Brown University. They divorced in 2016.

In 2016, Sternlicht moved to Florida.

=== Wealth ===
According to Forbes, Sternlicht has an estimated net worth of $4.4 billion and is ranked 260th on the Forbes 400.

=== Philanthropy ===
In 2007, Sternlicht and then-wife Mimi funded a $1 million grant to the Harvard Stem Cell Institute to support research for a cure for diabetes.

In 2024, Sternlicht stopped his donations to Brown University, his alma mater, after the university agreed to hold a board vote addressing student protestors' desire to divest from companies doing business with Israel in the aftermath of the October 7, 2023 attacks on Israel by Hamas and subsequent Israeli military actions in Gaza. He believed the protestors were "ignorant" and also lacked "facts and moral clarity."

=== Political contributions ===
Sternlicht has historically identified as a Republican, though more recently has characterized his political views as independent.

Sternlicht is a "self-described friend and golf partner" of Donald Trump but was disappointed Trump did not move to the political center as President of the United States. In 2008, Sternlicht donated first to the Hillary Clinton 2008 presidential primary campaign and then to the Barack Obama 2008 presidential campaign. In 2012, Sternlicht contributed $70,800 to the presidential campaign of Mitt Romney. In 2016, Sternlicht contributed $125,000 to Right to Rise, the political action committee created to support the Jeb Bush 2016 presidential campaign.

When asked if he identified as a Republican in a 2020 interview, Sternlicht commented "What are you, crazy? I’m an independent. I’m socially liberal and fiscally conservative. I think capitalism is the best form of government, but I think it needs to be regulated."

Following Hamas's attack on Israel on October 7, 2023, a staffer for Sternlicht, at his direction, initiated a long-standing group chat on WhatsApp with some of the United States' most powerful business leaders, with the stated goals of "chang[ing] the narrative" in favor of Israel and "help[ing] win the war" of U.S. public opinion. The chat, which eventually expanded to approximately 100 members before it was shut down in early May 2024, included former CEO of Starbucks Howard Schultz, Dell founder and CEO Michael Dell, Kind snack company founder Daniel Lubetzky, hedge fund managers Daniel Loeb and Bill Ackman, billionaire Len Blavatnik, real estate investor Joseph Sitt, and Joshua Kushner, the founder of Thrive Capital and brother to Jared Kushner, president Donald Trump's son-in-law. The group also included non-American citizens, such as Cypriot-Israeli billionaire real estate investor Yakir Gabay.

Members of the 2023-2024 WhatsApp group chat discussed how they received private briefings by, and worked closely with, members of the Israeli government, including former Israeli prime minister Naftali Bennett; Benny Gantz, a member of the Israeli war cabinet; and Israel’s ambassador to the United States, Michael Herzog. Members of the group also held a video call in late April 2024 with New York City Mayor Eric Adams in an effort to, according to reporting by The Washington Post, "pressure Columbia’s president and trustees to permit the mayor to send police to the campus" in order to shut down criticism of Israel's offensive military operations in Gaza, which many campus protesters, intergovernmental and non-governmental organizations, civil servants, and governments around the world have alleged to be genocide. During the video call, group members discussed making political donations to Adams.

Sternlicht also appears in the directory of Peter Thiel's Dialog organization.
