= Archstone =

US real estate investment trust

Archstone Enterprise LP
- Type: Limited Partnership
- Industry: Real estate
- Predecessors: Security Capital Pacific Trust and Security Capital Atlantic Inc.
- Founded: 1946 as Archstone since 1998
- Defunct: February 27, 2013; 13 years ago
- Fate: Acquired
- Headquarters: United States
- Products: Apartments

Archstone was an American real estate investment trust that invested in apartments. In 2007, the company was acquired by Tishman Speyer and Lehman Brothers. In 2013 the company was liquidated and the company's assets were acquired by Equity Residential and AvalonBay Communities (now Vivmark Residential). At the time of the liquidation, it owned over 40,000 apartment units.

== History ==
In 1998, Security Capital Pacific Trust and Security Capital Atlantic Inc. merged to form Archstone Communities. The merged company owned 304 properties and 90,166 apartments. Security Capital had been founded by William D. Sanders in 1990.

In 2001, the company acquired Charles E. Smith Residential Realty, the apartment company founded by Charles E. Smith and the largest real estate owner in the Washington, D.C. metropolitan area, in a $2.2 billion transaction.

In 2007, the company was acquired by Tishman Speyer and Lehman Brothers in a $22.2 billion transaction. At that time, the company owned interests in 359 apartment communities including 87,667 apartment units.

In February 2013, Equity Residential and AvalonBay Communities (now Vivmark Residential) acquired the company from Lehman Brothers in a $9 billion transaction.
