= Sullivan South High School =

Location
- 1236 Moreland Dr; Kingsport, Tennessee 37664; United States; 36.4905°N 82.5338°W

Information
- School type: Public, high school
- Founded: 1980
- School district: Sullivan County Schools
- Faculty: 54.00 (FTE)
- Grades: 9–12
- Enrollment: 754 (2019–20)
- Student to teacher ratio: 13.96
- Language: English
- Colors: Columbia blue and silver
- Mascot: Rebels

Sullivan South High School was a public high school (grades 9–12) located near Kingsport, Tennessee, in Sullivan County with a student body of just under nine hundred students. The school was formed in 1980 and closed in 2021, when the building was converted to Sullivan Heights Middle School and its students were reapportioned to West Ridge High School. Greg Harvey served as principal of Sullivan South between 2003 and 2017, leading the school for 14 years all together. Josh Tate, formerly an assistant principal at Sullivan South High School, served as principal from 2017 until the school's closing. The school was accredited by the Southern Association of Colleges and Schools and was a member of the TSSAA. With a graduation rate of 98%, it was well above the state median for high school completion.

== History ==
Sullivan South High School was formed in 1980 combining students from Sullivan West High School (formerly Sullivan High School) and Colonial Heights-based students that previously attended Sullivan Central High School. Upon its formation, Sullivan West High School became Sullivan Middle School and became one of the two main feeder schools to Sullivan South alongside Colonial Heights Middle School. It closed in May 2021, becoming the middle school Sullivan Heights, and its student body was consolidated with those of Sullivan North and Sullivan Central High Schools into the new West Ridge High School.

== Academics ==
Sullivan South operated on a block schedule with four 90-minute and one 45-minute year-long classes a day. It offered "accelerated," AP, and technical/vocational courses in mathematics, the sciences, humanities, and technical fields. Many of the academic classes were also offered with Honors variations as well at all four grade levels. Sullivan South also participated in a program with Northeast State Community College through which many students earned college credit before graduating. Sullivan South also offered a variety of CTE classes including digital art, agriculture education, culinary arts, information technology, health science, cosmetology, welding, and engineering.

== Extracurriculars ==
Drama, visual arts, and music courses were offered. There were multiple of each of these classes offered at different levels ranging from beginner to experienced. Students could take acting or technical theatre, chorus, visual art, and marching and concert band. Sullivan South had an Air Force JROTC program as well as chapters of Future Farmers of America and SkillsUSA. The school also had several after-school clubs, including a chapter of the National Beta Club and Key Club International. Sports at Sullivan South included football, baseball, soccer, softball, swimming, basketball, volleyball, cheer, and dance.

== Notable alumni ==
- Barry Bales, bass player and harmony vocalist for Alison Krauss and Union Station; graduated 1987
- Matt Mahaffey, lead singer for the 1990s rock band Self; graduated 1991
- Hal Lawton, CEO of Tractor Supply; graduated 1992
- Dan Wright, former pitcher in the Seattle Mariners organization; graduated 1996
