= Bob Faith =

American businessman

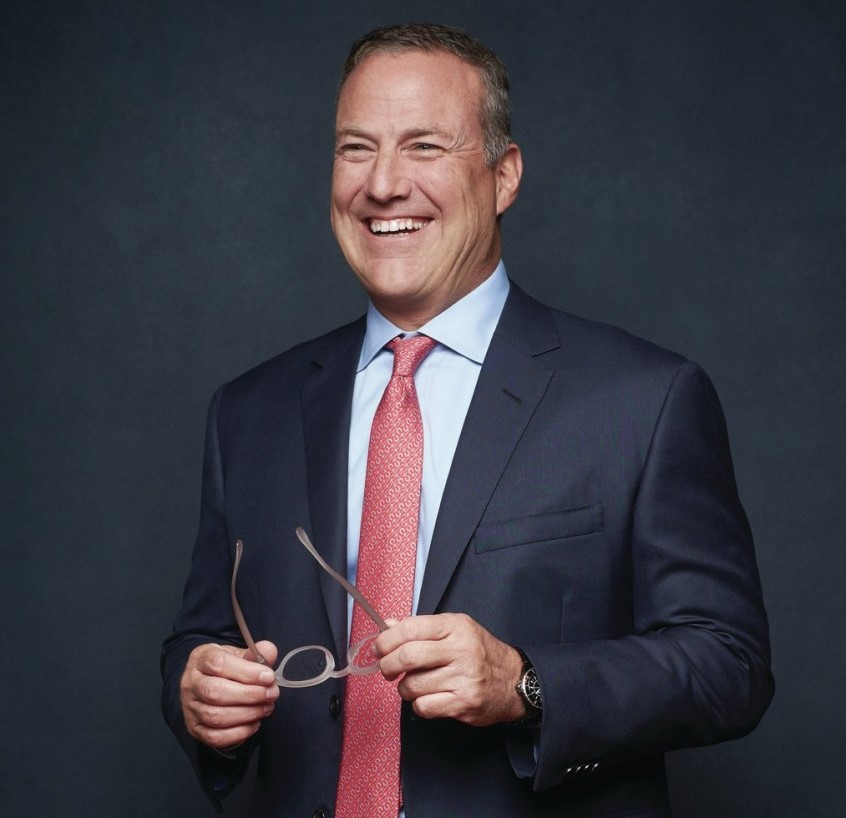
- Born: Robert Alan Faith; 1963 or 1964 (age 61–62)
- Education: University of Oklahoma (BS); Harvard University (MBA)
- Title: Founder, Chairman and CEO of Greystar Real Estate Partners
- Spouse: Muffie Faith
- Children: 3

Robert Alan Faith (born 1963/1964) is an American businessman, and the founder, chairman and chief executive officer (CEO) of Greystar Real Estate Partners.

== Early life ==
Faith grew up in Oklahoma, and earned a bachelor's degree in petroleum engineering from the University of Oklahoma, intending to pursue a career in the oil industry as his father had. While in college, Faith was a member of Delta Upsilon fraternity, then located at 603 West Brooks in Norman. When a recession made petroleum engineer jobs less available upon graduation, Faith opted instead to get an MBA from Harvard University, graduating in 1986.

== Career ==
Faith started his career at the Trammell Crow Company, a real estate development firm where he eventually became a partner. In 1991, he co-founded Starwood Capital Group with Barry Sternlicht, a classmate from Harvard. The company focused on acquiring foreclosed multifamily properties in the aftermath of the savings and loan crisis.

In 1993, Faith founded Greystar in Houston, Texas. While CEO of Greystar, Faith served as Secretary of Commerce for the State of South Carolina from 2002 to 2006. During his tenure, Faith reorganized the department's 19-division structure into four departments. In 1996, he co-founded Homegate Hospitality, a developer of extended-stay hotels, with John Kratzer, a former colleague from Trammell Crow. The company was acquired the next year. Faith moved both his residence and Greystar’s headquarters to Charleston, South Carolina, in 1998. Under Faith's leadership, Greystar acquired Education Realty Trust in 2018 for $4.6 billion, making the company the second largest student housing provider in the United States. Other major acquisitions during Faith's tenure include the property management arm of Alliance Residential Co. in June 2020, Thackeray Partners in May 2021, and Fizzy Living in December 2021. Faith is also expanding the business beyond multifamily rental properties to sectors including life sciences, purpose-built single-family rentals, and industrial. As of November 2021, Greystar is the largest operator of apartments in the United States, with $45.1 billion of assets under management.

== Recognition and related activities ==
As of 2005, Faith was a member of the Urban Land Institute and the National Multifamily Housing Council. In 2020, Faith was nominated to the real estate group of the Great American Economic Revival Industry Groups, a bipartisan panel convened by President Donald Trump during the COVID-19 pandemic.

In 2018, Faith appeared on the Observer list of the 59 most powerful people in residential real estate.

In 2022, Faith ranked #32 on the Commercial Observer Power 100 list of commercial real estate's most powerful people. He ranked #10 in 2023 and #6 in 2024.

== Personal life ==
Faith resides in Charleston, South Carolina, with his family. He is married to interior designer Muffie Faith, and they have three children.

=== Wealth ===
According to Forbes, Faith has an estimated net worth of $5 billion as of January 2026.
