= Starwood Capital Group =

American private equity and investment firm

- Industry: Private equity
- Founded: 1991; 35 years ago in Greenwich, Connecticut, United States
- Founder: Barry Sternlicht; Robert Faith
- Headquarters: Miami Beach, Florida
- Key people: Barry Sternlicht (chairman & CEO)
- AUM: Approx. $115 billion (2024)
- Divisions: Starwood Retail Partners
- Website: starwoodcapital.com

Starwood Capital Group is an American investment firm headquartered in Miami Beach, Florida. It is managed by Barry Sternlicht. It was co-founded by Sternlicht and Robert Faith in 1991. In 1993, Faith left Starwood to found Greystar Real Estate Partners.

== History ==
In 1991, at the age of 31, Sternlicht launched the firm to buy apartment buildings that were being sold by the Resolution Trust Corporation, created by the federal government to hold and liquidate the real estate assets owned by failed banks after the savings and loan crisis. Sternlicht raised $20 million from the families of William Bernard Ziff Jr. and Carter Burden of New York to fund these purchases.

In 1993, the company contributed the apartment portfolio to Sam Zell's Equity Residential in exchange for a 20% stake in the company.

In 1994, in partnership with Goldman Sachs, the company purchased Westin Hotels & Resorts in a $561 million transaction. In January 1995, Starwood purchased Hotel Investors Trust, an almost-bankrupt real estate investment trust, and in 2005, acquired Groupe du Louvre, which owned crystal maker Baccarat. Groupe de Louvre was sold in 2015, but Baccarat was retained by Starwood.

In 2009, a consortium led by Starwood Capital bought 40% of the loan portfolio of Corus Bankshares, which suffered from bank failure. In 2010, the company lost an auction to buy Extended Stay Hotels, which was in bankruptcy. Starwood unsuccessfully filed an objection against the sale to Centerbridge Partners with the bankruptcy court in Manhattan. In the same year, Starwood received a majority ownership stake in Riviera Holdings, owners of the Riviera hotel and casino in Las Vegas, Nevada and Riviera Black Hawk in Black Hawk, Colorado, after a bankruptcy reorganization.

In 2012, the company began construction of a chain of hotels under the name of Baccarat Hotels and Resorts, featuring crystal chandeliers from Baccarat. In 2015, the firm sold its flagship Baccarat hotel in New York City. In the same year, the group partnered with Toll Brothers to develop the Pierhouse at Brooklyn Bridge Park.

In December 2013, Starwood Global Opportunity Fund IX, in partnership with Vencom, bought 7 retail properties from the Swedish retail group Kooperativa Förbundet for 3.9 billion Swedish kronor ($593.3 million), and sold these in 2016 and 2017. That year, the company acquired seven malls from Westfield Group, including Great Northern Mall in North Olmsted and Franklin Park Mall in Toledo, with properties in Indiana, California and Washington, together dubbed Starwood West.

Between 2013 and 2014, Starwood also acquired three British hospitality groups: De Vere Group for £232 million, Four-Pillars Hotels for £90 million, and Principal Hayley Group for £360 million.

In February 2014, Starwood Property Trust spun off Starwood Waypoint Residential Trust, a single-family rental real estate investment trust. In January 2016, Starwood Waypoint Residential Trust merged with Colony American Homes, creating Colony Starwood Homes. In 2017, it was merged into Invitation Homes.

In March 2014, the firm acquired a stake in the A.S. Roma football club, and in October 2014, Starwood purchased 7 upscale malls in Virginia, Florida, North Carolina, Texas, and Michigan from Taubman Centers in a $1.4 billion transaction.

In April 2015, Starwood acquired The Arboretum of South Barrington, a 480,000-square-foot open-air shopping center in South Barrington, Illinois, for approximately $100 million.

In 2016, the company acquired 23,262 apartments from Equity Residential for $5.365 billion.

In September 2017, Starwood invested $250 million in YOTEL for a 30% stake.

In September 2020, UnionBank filed a $67.2 million foreclosure lawsuit against Starwood property The Arboretum of South Barrington. The lawsuit alleged that the firm failed to pay interest on the mortgage and did not pay off the debt when it matured in April 2020. The foreclosure proceedings concluded in June 2022, when Hoffman Estates based investor Rick Heidner purchased the defaulted $67 million loan and took control of the asset.

In 2021, Starwood's mall holdings had decreased from thirty to eight with the impact of the COVID-19 pandemic on the retail industry, and the company selling some properties at a loss to reduce its $2 billion in CMBS mortgage debt. The firm invested in Alex Israel's Metropolis Technologies that year.

In 2022, CEO Sternlicht voiced strong criticism of the Federal Reserve for creating calamitous economic conditions by needlessly raising interest rates.

In 2024, the firm limited the amount of money that its investors could withdraw in order to preserve its available supply of cash. This decision was made at a time when the firm was being negatively impacted by rising interest rates and the impact of the COVID-19 pandemic on the real estate industry.

=== Real estate investments ===
Belden Village Mall; Belmar (Lakewood); Capital Mall; Fairlane Town Center; Franklin Park Mall; Gateway Mall (Lincoln, Nebraska); Great Northern Mall (Ohio)	Louis Joliet Mall; Northridge Mall; Parkway Plaza; Plaza West Covina; Rimrock Mall; SouthPark Mall (Ohio); Solano Town Center; Southlake Mall (Indiana)	Triangle building; The Arboretum of South Barrington; The Mall at Partridge Creek; The Mall at Wellington Green; The Promenade Bolingbrook; Westland Mall (Hialeah)
