= South Barrington, Illinois =

- Village
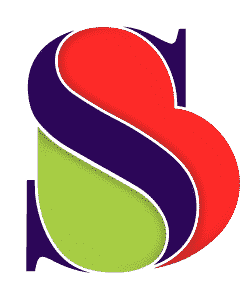
- logo

- Location of South Barrington in Cook County, Illinois.

- Location within Chicago metropolitan area Location within Illinois Location within the United States
- Coordinates: 42°5′3″N 88°9′17″W
- Country: United States
- State: Illinois
- County: Cook
- Township: Barrington
- Incorporated: 1959

Government
  - Type: President-trustee
  - President: Paula McCombie

Area
  - Total: 7.71 sq mi (19.97 km^{2})
  - Land: 7.43 sq mi (19.24 km^{2})
  - Water: 0.28 sq mi (0.73 km^{2}) 3.67%

Population (2020)
  - Total: 5,077
  - Density: 683.5/sq mi (263.92/km^{2})

Standard of living (2007-11)
  - Per capita income: $70,004
  - Median home value: $841,900
- ZIP code: 60010
- Area codes: 847 & 224
- Geocode: 70,564
- FIPS code: 17-70564
- Website: www.southbarrington.org

South Barrington is a residential suburb in Cook County, Illinois, United States, south of Barrington. Per the 2020 census, the population was 5,077. It is the location of the famous megachurch Willow Creek Community Church, a lifestyle center (shopping center) named The Arboretum of South Barrington, and Goebbert’s Farm & Garden Center, a long-running family-owned agritourism site known for its annual fall pumpkin festival.

== Geography ==
South Barrington is located at 42°5′3″N 88°9′17″W (42.084226, -88.15478).

According to the 2021 census gazetteer files, South Barrington has a total area of 7.71 square miles (19.97 km^{2}), of which 7.43 square miles (19.24 km^{2}) (or 96.33%) is land and 0.28 square miles (0.73 km^{2}) (or 3.67%) is water.

== Demographics ==
Historical population
| Census | Pop. | Note | %± |
|---|---|---|---|
| 1960 | 473 | | — |
| 1970 | 348 | | −26.4% |
| 1980 | 1,168 | | 235.6% |
| 1990 | 2,937 | | 151.5% |
| 2000 | 3,760 | | 28.0% |
| 2010 | 4,565 | | 21.4% |
| 2020 | 5,077 | | 11.2% |
U.S. Decennial Census; 2010 2020

=== Racial and ethnic composition ===
South Barrington village, Illinois – Racial and ethnic composition Note: the US Census treats Hispanic/Latino as an ethnic category. This table excludes Latinos from the racial categories and assigns them to a separate category. Hispanics/Latinos may be of any race.
| Race / Ethnicity (NH = Non-Hispanic) | Pop 2000 | Pop 2010 | Pop 2020 | % 2000 | % 2010 | % 2020 |
|---|---|---|---|---|---|---|
| White alone (NH) | 3,043 | 3,080 | 2,672 | 80.93% | 67.47% | 52.63% |
| Black or African American alone (NH) | 33 | 29 | 39 | 0.88% | 0.64% | 0.77% |
| Native American or Alaska Native alone (NH) | 2 | 8 | 2 | 0.05% | 0.18% | 0.04% |
| Asian alone (NH) | 541 | 1,213 | 2,041 | 14.39% | 26.57% | 40.20% |
| Pacific Islander alone (NH) | 1 | 0 | 0 | 0.03% | 0.00% | 0.00% |
| Other race alone (NH) | 11 | 15 | 3 | 0.29% | 0.33% | 0.06% |
| Mixed race or Multiracial (NH) | 60 | 102 | 159 | 1.60% | 2.23% | 3.13% |
| Hispanic or Latino (any race) | 69 | 118 | 161 | 1.84% | 2.58% | 3.17% |
| Total | 3,760 | 4,565 | 5,077 | 100.00% | 100.00% | 100.00% |

=== 2020 census ===
As of the 2020 census, South Barrington had a population of 5,077, with 1,642 households and 1,447 families residing in the village. The population density was 658.50 inhabitants per square mile (254.25/km^{2}). The median age was 47.6 years. 23.8% of residents were under the age of 18 and 22.6% were 65 years of age or older. For every 100 females, there were 96.8 males, and for every 100 females age 18 and over, there were 94.6 males age 18 and over.

100.0% of residents lived in urban areas, while 0.0% lived in rural areas.

Of the 1,642 households, 38.5% had children under the age of 18 living in them. Of all households, 81.7% were married-couple households, 5.2% were households with a male householder and no spouse or partner present, and 11.0% were households with a female householder and no spouse or partner present. About 8.7% of all households were made up of individuals, and 5.6% had someone living alone who was 65 years of age or older.

There were 1,722 housing units, of which 4.6% were vacant. The homeowner vacancy rate was 2.1% and the rental vacancy rate was 18.8%.

=== Income and poverty ===
The median income for a household in the village was $183,750, and the median income for a family was $188,496. Males had a median income of $128,277 versus $58,750 for females. The per capita income for the village was $71,005. About 0.8% of families and 1.7% of the population were below the poverty line, including 0.0% of those under age 18 and 2.9% of those age 65 or over.

== Education ==
Most of South Barrington's zoned public schools are in Barrington District 220. The schools in this district that are assigned to homes in the village are:

- Barbara B Rose Elementary School (K-5)
- Grove Avenue Elementary School (K-5)
- Countryside Elementary School (K-5)
- Barrington Middle School Prairie Campus (6–8)
- Barrington Middle School Station Campus (6–8)
- Barrington High School (9–12)

A small portion of the village is served by Thomas Jefferson Elementary School (K-6) in nearby Hoffman Estates, Carl Sandburg Junior High School (7–8) in Rolling Meadows, both of District 15, and William Fremd High School (9–12; Township High School District 211) in Palatine. Another small portion of South Barrington is served by District 300, specifically Parkview Elementary School, Carpentersville Middle School, and Dundee Crown High School. These three schools are located in Carpentersville, Illinois.

== Transportation ==
Pace provides I-90 Express bus service on at the I-90/Barrington Road station at the south end of the village.

== Notable people ==
- Craig Anderson, goaltender for the Colorado Avalanche and Ottawa Senators
- Paul Bragiel, Colombian National Team cross-country skier, venture capitalist
- Mike Magee, forward with the Chicago Fire Soccer Club
- Jarrett Payton, professional football player and sports broadcaster. Son of Walter Payton.
- Walter Payton, Hall of Fame running back with the Chicago Bears
- Mike Singletary, Hall of Fame linebacker and coach with several NFL teams
