= Greystar =

Real estate investment firm

Greystar Real Estate Partners
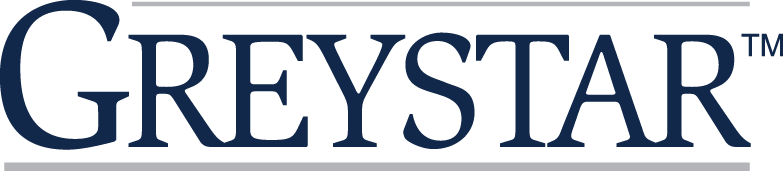
- Type: Private
- Industry: Real estate
- Founded: 1993; 33 years ago
- Founder: Bob Faith
- Headquarters: Charleston, South Carolina, US
- Key people: Bob Faith (CEO and chairman)
- Services: Property development, Investment management, Property management
- AUM: US$76 billion (2023)
- Number of employees: 23,000
- Website: greystar.com

Roosevelt Point Apartments in Phoenix, Arizona, are operated by Greystar

Greystar Real Estate Partners is an international real estate developer and manager based in the United States.

Per NMHC report, Greystar was the largest apartment manager in the United States, with over 798,272 units as of 2024. It is also the country's largest apartment owner, with 108,566 units.

== History ==
Greystar was founded in 1993 by chairman and CEO Bob Faith, and headquartered in Charleston, South Carolina.

The company began operating in the UK in 2013.

In April 2024, the National Multifamily Housing Council, an industry trade group, announced that Greystar was the United States' largest apartment owner after adding over 10,000 units to its portfolio in 2023.

== Lawsuits ==
In 2019, the company was sued for violating consumer protection laws. In a Los Angeles County Superior Court filing, Greystar was charged with gathering extensive personal identifying information about its tenants without their knowledge or consent. At five Greystar-owned apartment buildings, the company collected information about its tenants' "character" and "general reputation." In 2021, the firm's business model was alleged to be adding to Ireland's housing crisis.

In June 2019, a crane collapsed on apartments owned by Greystar in Old East Dallas, causing serious injury to numerous tenants and the death of one woman. Greystar were subsequently found to have been negligent and were required to pay $860 million in damages to the 17 plaintiffs, including the parents of the deceased. The court in Dallas found that Greystar had violated safety regulations in several ways, including the presence of a Greystar sign on top of the crane which was a contributing factor to its collapse.

In 2022, a tenant at a Greystar property in Charlotte, North Carolina filed a lawsuit against the company, alleging that Greystar failed to perform necessary building maintenance. In October 2022, Greystar was a co-defendant in a lawsuit filed against the property management software company RealPage. The suit alleged that RealPage colluded with Greystar, among other property management companies, to fix rent prices at those companies' properties.

In January 2024, a tenant at a Greystar property in Lakewood, Colorado sued Greystar over alleged junk fees the company added to her monthly rent. That same month, Greystar charged a Loveland, Colorado family $4,140 in lease-breaking penalty fees following the death of the lease's primary signer.

In January 2025, the US Department of Justice (DOJ) and the Attorneys General of 10 US states amended an antitrust lawsuit against RealPage, which had been initiated in August 2024, to add Greystar and five other major US landlords as defendants, alleging that the landlords had engaged in price fixing and illegally colluded to share competitively sensitive information using RealPage's property management software.

In April 2025, the Federal Trade Commission and Colorado Attorney General Phil Weiser filed a lawsuit against Greystar, alleging that the company advertised deceptively low lease rates and only revealed mandatory hidden fees after prospective tenants had paid nonrefundable application fees.

In August 2025, Greystar reached a settlement with the DOJ in which it agreed to help the government in its case against RealPage but admitted no wrongdoing, as well as reaching a settlement at the same time with private plaintiffs who had brought a similar class action suit as renters.
