= RealPage =

American property software corporation

RealPage, Inc.
- Type: Private
- Industry: Software
- Founded: 1998; 28 years ago
- Headquarters: Richardson, Texas
- Key people: Dirk Wakeham (CEO) as of Nov. 2025
- Owner: Thoma Bravo
- Number of employees: 7,540 as of Aug. 2026
- Website: www.realpage.com

RealPage, Inc. is an American company that produces property management software for algorithmic rent setting. It is headquartered in Texas and owned by the private equity firm Thoma Bravo. Its services are used on more than 24 million housing units worldwide in multifamily, commercial, single-family, and vacation rentals.

In 2024, the United States Department of Justice sued RealPage, alleging that its software represented a price fixing scheme to raise rents. San Francisco banned algorithmic rent pricing in August 2024. Since 2025, Dirk Wakeham has been the president and chief executive officer.

== History ==
RealPage was founded in 1998 with the acquisition of Rent Roll, Inc., a provider of on-premises property management systems for the conventional and affordable multifamily rental housing markets. RealPage moved its corporate headquarters to Richardson, Texas in 2016, and in 2017 acquired four companies: apartment market data provider Axiometrics; utility and energy management company American Utility Management; revenue management and pricing provider Lease Rent Options; and On-Site, a leasing and marketing platform company.

In 2018, RealPage announced an agreement to purchase electronic payment platform company ClickPay, located in Hackensack, New Jersey. In July 2019, RealPage acquired utility management company SimpleBills. In December 2019, RealPage acquired Buildium. In January 2020, RealPage has agreed to acquire Modern Message, Inc. In September 2020, RealPage acquired real estate IoT startup Stratis.

In December 2020, private-equity firm Thoma Bravo announced it would acquire RealPage for $9.6 billion, paying $88.75 per share for the company, a premium of 31% for its closing prices at the time. Its shares were reported up 26% that year. The acquisition completed in April 2021. In January 2021, RealPage acquired bulk Internet provider WhiteSky. Later, in May of that same year, RealPage acquired Boingo Wireless's Multifamily Business.

In 2024, RealPage released residential platform LOFT Living.

In July 2025, RealPage acquired Livble, a payment processing firm that offers an installment-based rent payment system for which it charges a fee.

== Reactions and lawsuits ==
RealPage has been accused of antitrust violations and price fixing in the rental market. Lawsuits against RealPage make the claim that if it is illegal for an individual to engage in price fixing, then it should be illegal when it is done by software or algorithm. The lawsuits also accuse RealPage of pressuring its customers to comply with its pricing suggestions.

=== Lawsuits ===
In October 2022, ProPublica reported that landlords use RealPage's asset optimization algorithm called YieldStar (later rebranded as AI Revenue Management) to increase rents throughout the United States, naming its users an illegal cartel that encouraged participants to withhold rental units from the market. Approximately 90% of property managers/landlords approve price changes suggested by the software. RealPage's software strongly discourages landlord users from negotiating rent prices with tenants. In November 2022, the United States Department of Justice's Antitrust Division opened an investigation into RealPage, which is accused of contributing to higher rent prices throughout the United States. The company's YieldStar software is alleged to use an algorithm to "help landlords push the highest possible rents on tenants." In November 2023, Attorney General of the District of Columbia Brian Schwalb filed an antitrust price-fixing lawsuit against RealPage and more than a dozen of the largest apartment building landlords in Washington, D.C., accusing them of illegally conspiring to set rental prices artificially high by sharing competitively sensitive data using RealPage's revenue management platform.

In April 2023, more than 20 private civil antitrust lawsuits against RealPage, which had been filed primarily on behalf of renters of multifamily apartments and which alleged that the company illegally conspired to keep prices above market rates, were consolidated in federal court in Nashville, Tennessee. In November 2023, the US Justice Department filed a "statement of interest" in support of the lawsuits, arguing that the use of shared data and algorithms must "be subject to the same condemnation" as other price-fixing schemes. In December 2023, Chief US District Judge Waverly Crenshaw denied RealPage's bid to dismiss the consolidated lawsuits. In August 2024, the Department of Justice along with the Attorneys General of eight states filed a civil antitrust lawsuit against RealPage, alleging that the company engaged in an "unlawful scheme to decrease competition among landlords" and sought "to monopolize the market for commercial revenue management software that landlords use to price apartments," thereby harming millions of renters by depriving them of the benefits of competition.

In April 2025, the Attorney General of New Jersey Matt Platkin filed a lawsuit against RealPage and 10 New Jersey-based landlords, accusing them of working together as "a rent-setting cartel" and colluding to use RealPage's "anticompetitive algorithm" to raise rents in violation of the Sherman Antitrust Act, the New Jersey Antitrust Act, and the New Jersey Consumer Fraud Act.

=== Bans ===
In January 2024, U.S. Senators Ron Wyden and Peter Welch introduced federal legislation, titled the Preventing the Algorithmic Facilitation of Rental Housing Cartels Act of 2024, that would ban the coordination of rental housing price information, as well as prohibiting the use of services of companies such as RealPage and Yardi that allow landlords to coordinate rental housing prices.

In August 2024, the San Francisco Board of Supervisors unanimously approved an ordinance banning landlords from using software or algorithms, such as those offered by RealPage and Yardi, to set rents or manage occupancy within the city. Similar bans have been adopted in Jersey City, Minneapolis, Philadelphia, Portland, San Diego, and Seattle.

In May 2025, the Colorado state legislature passed a bill banning algorithmic price setting of rents, but the bill was vetoed by Governor Jared Polis. In October 2025, a ban on algorithmic price setting of rents was signed into law in New York state by Governor Kathy Hochul, following a similar bill being signed into law in California in September 2025. RealPage filed a lawsuit against the New York ban in November 2025, alleging it was an "unconstitutional ban on lawful speech."
