= Donald Trump 2016 presidential campaign =

American political campaign

Donald Trump for President 2016
- Campaign: 2016 Republican primaries 2016 U.S. presidential election
- Candidate: Donald Trump; Chairman of The Trump Organization (1971–2017); Mike Pence; 50th Governor of Indiana (2013–2017)
- Affiliation: Republican Party
- Status: Announcement: June 16, 2015; 11 years ago; Nomination as Republican candidate: May 26, 2016; Official nomination: July 19, 2016; Election victory: November 9, 2016; Certification: January 6, 2017; Inauguration: January 20, 2017
- Headquarters: Trump Tower, Manhattan, New York
- Key people: Steve Bannon (Chief executive); Kellyanne Conway (Campaign manager); David Bossie (Deputy campaign manager); Michael Glassner (campaign manager); Jason Miller (Communications director); Katrina Pierson (National spokesperson); Hope Hicks (Press secretary); Dan Scavino (Director of social media); Ben Carson (VP Selection Committee Leader); Jeff Sessions (Chairman of National Security Committee); Michael Flynn (Military Advisor); Omarosa Manigault (Director of African American Outreach); Tony Fabrizio (Pollster); Rudy Giuliani (Senior Advisor); David Urban (Senior Advisor); Chris Christie (White House Transition Chairman); Bill Palatucci (White House Transition Coordinator); Michael Cohen (Special Counsel); Arthur Culvahouse (VP Vetter); Sam Clovis (National Co-chair); Brad Parscale (Digital director) Steven Cheung (Rapid Response Director); Roger Ailes (Debate Advisor); Boris Epshteyn (Senior Advisor); Anthony Scaramucci (Finance Committee); George Papadopoulos (Foreign Policy Advisor); Peter Navarro (Trade Advisor); Patrick Caddell (adviser); Corey Lewandowski (Campaign manager; left campaign on June 20, 2016); Roger Stone (Political adviser; left campaign on August 8, 2015); Sam Nunberg (Political adviser; left campaign on August 3, 2015); Paul Manafort (Campaign chairman; left campaign on August 19, 2016); Rick Gates (Deputy Campaign Chairman; left campaign in August 2016); Michael Caputo (Head of Communications; left campaign on June 20, 2016); Carter Page (Foreign Policy Advisor; left campaign on September 24, 2016)
- Receipts: US$350,668,435.70 (December 31, 2016)
- Slogan(s): Make America Great Again; Lock Her Up; Build the wall Make America One Again; Make America Proud Again; Make America Safe Again; Make America Strong Again; Make America Work Again; Make Manufacturing Great Again; The Silent Majority Stands with Trump; Trump Digs Coal
- Chant: "America First"; "I'm with You"; "Build That Wall"; "Trump!"; "USA!"; "Lock Her Up"; "CNN Sucks"; "Drain the swamp"

Website
- www.donaldjtrump.com (archived 29 June 2015)

Donald Trump ran a successful campaign for the 2016 U.S. presidential election. He formally announced his campaign on June 16, 2015, at Trump Tower in New York City, initially battling for the Republican Party's nomination. On May 26, 2016, he became the Republican Party's presumptive nominee. Trump was officially nominated on July 19 at the Republican National Convention. He chose Mike Pence, the sitting governor of Indiana, as his vice presidential running mate. On November 8, Trump and Pence were elected president and vice president of the United States.

Trump's populist positions in opposition to illegal immigration and various trade agreements, such as the Trans-Pacific Partnership, earned him support especially among voters who were male, white, blue-collar, working class, and those without college degrees. Many voters in the Rust Belt, who gave Trump the electoral votes needed to win the presidency, switched from supporting Bernie Sanders to Trump after Hillary Clinton won the Democratic nomination.

Many of Trump's remarks were controversial and helped his campaign garner extensive coverage by the mainstream media, trending topics, and social media. Trump's campaign rallies attracted large crowds as well as public controversy. Some of the events were marked by incidents of violence between Trump supporters and protesters, mistreatment of journalists, and disruption by a large group of protesters who effectively shut down a major rally in Chicago. Trump himself was accused of inciting violence at his rallies.

Trump's disdain for political correctness was a staple theme of his campaign and proved popular among his supporters. Many, including some mainstream commentators and some prominent Republicans, viewed him as appealing to racism, a charge that Trump repeatedly denied. Trump's most polarizing and widely reported proposals were about issues of immigration and border security, especially his proposed deportation of all illegal immigrants, the proposed construction of a substantial wall on the Mexico–United States border at Mexico's expense, his false characterizations of many illegal Mexican immigrants as "criminals, drug dealers, rapists, etc.", and a temporary ban on foreign Muslims entering the U.S. After considerable backlash, he later modified the "Trump travel ban" to apply to people originating from countries which he described as having a history of terrorism against the United States or its allies. This was also criticized for excluding countries which the U.S. has significant financial ties with, such as Saudi Arabia.

Opposition to Trump grew during his campaign among both Republicans (who viewed Trump as irrevocably damaging to the party and its chances of winning elections during and after 2016, leading to the coalescence of the Never Trump movement) and Democrats (who decried Trump's anti-immigrant and anti-Muslim policies, his behavior toward critics, his treatment of the media, and his support from the ethno-nationalist alt-right). Although some prominent Republican leaders declined to endorse Trump after he won the Republican nomination, many Republican congress-members showed support for Trump and his policy positions despite major personal or political conflicts with him. Some such supporters of Trump's campaign were accused, by both conservatives and liberals, of prioritizing party loyalty and avoiding alienation of Trump supporters to ensure re-election, thereby refraining from condemning Trump's actions.

On January 6, 2017, the United States government's intelligence agencies concluded that the Russian government interfered in the United States elections against the campaign of Clinton and in support of Trump, triggering subsequent investigation. As president, Trump repeatedly rejected the conclusions of the U.S. intelligence agencies.

== Background ==
Since the 1988 presidential election, Trump was discussed as a potential candidate for president in nearly every election. In October 1999, Trump declared himself a potential candidate for the Reform Party's presidential nomination, but withdrew on February 14, 2000. In 2004, Trump said that he identified as a Democrat. Trump rejoined the Republican Party in September 2009, chose no party affiliation in December 2011, and again rejoined the GOP in April 2012. At the 2011 Conservative Political Action Conference, Trump said he is "pro-life" and "against gun control". He also spoke before Tea Party supporters. Early polls for the 2012 election had Trump among the leading candidates. In December 2011, Trump placed sixth in the "ten most admired men and women living of 2011" telephone survey conducted jointly by USA Today and Gallup. However, Trump announced in May 2011 that after what he termed "several months unofficially campaigning", he would not be a candidate for the office.

In 2013, Trump was a featured speaker at the Conservative Political Action Conference. In May 2013, it was reported that Trump had spent 1 million dollars on researching a presidential run in 2016. In October 2013, some New York Republicans, including Joseph Borelli and Carl Paladino (who later served as New York State Co-chairmen for the presidential campaign), suggested Trump should instead run for governor of the state in 2014. John Gauger, a former employee of Liberty University, told The Wall Street Journal in January 2019 that Trump's "fixer" Michael Cohen hired him to manipulate the Drudge Report and CNBC online polls in favor of Trump in 2014 and 2015. In February 2015, Trump did not renew his television contract for The Apprentice, which raised speculation of his candidacy for President of the United States in 2016. According to an April 7, 2015, memo released by WikiLeaks, Hillary Clinton's campaign instructed the Democratic National Committee to focus on "Pied Piper candidates" Donald Trump, Ted Cruz, and Ben Carson.

== Announcement ==
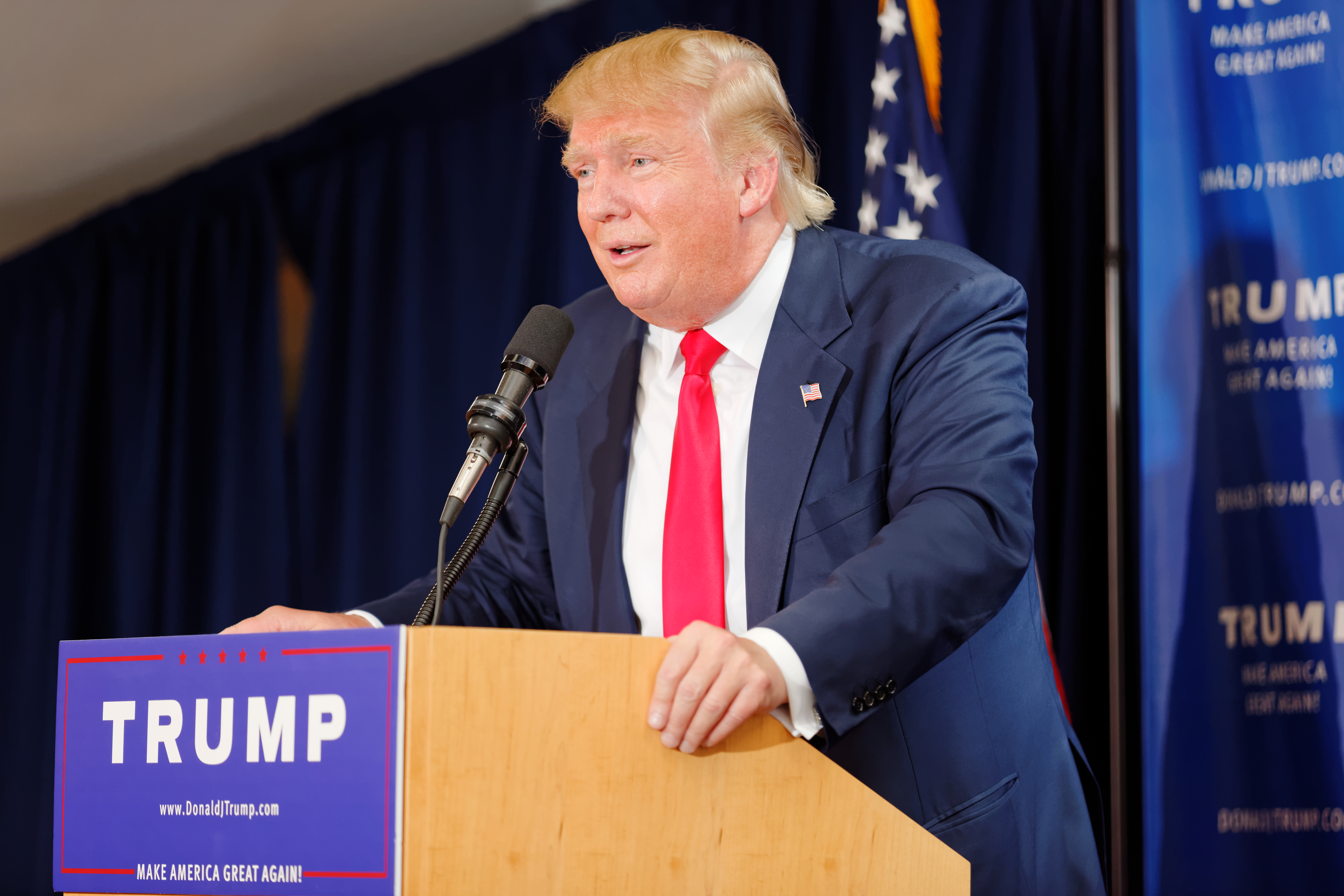
Trump at an early campaign event in New Hampshire on July 16, 2015

Trump formally announced his candidacy on June 16, 2015, with a campaign rally and a speech at Trump Tower in New York City. In the moments before his announcement, he came down a golden escalator at Trump Tower, which has since become a metonym for Trump's announcement. In his speech, Trump drew attention to domestic issues, such as illegal immigration, offshoring of American jobs, the U.S. national debt, and Islamic terrorism. The campaign slogan was announced as "Make America Great Again". Trump declared that he would self-fund his presidential campaign, and would refuse any money from donors and lobbyists. The British gambling company Ladbrokes offered 150/1 odds of Trump winning the presidency. The campaign hired a casting company to supply paid actors to attend the event.

Following the announcement, most of the media's attention focused on Trump's comment on illegal immigration: "When Mexico sends its people, they're not sending their best ... They're sending people that have lots of problems, and they're bringing those problems with [them]. They're bringing drugs. They're bringing crime. They're rapists. And some, I assume, are good people." The comment was interpreted and reported in various ways. Trump's statement was controversial and led several businesses and organizations—including NBC, Macy's, Univision, and NASCAR—to cut ties with Trump. Reactions from other presidential candidates were mixed, with some Republican candidates disagreeing with the tone of Trump's remarks yet supporting the core idea that illegal immigration is an important campaign issue, while other Republican candidates, along with the leading Democratic candidates, condemned Trump's remarks and his policy stances as offensive or inflammatory.

After the public backlash, Trump stood by his comments, citing news articles to back his claims. Trump said that he intended his comments to be aimed solely at the government of Mexico, specifically for using the insecure border as a means of transferring criminals into the United States and said he did not intend his comments to refer to immigrants themselves.

== Early campaign ==
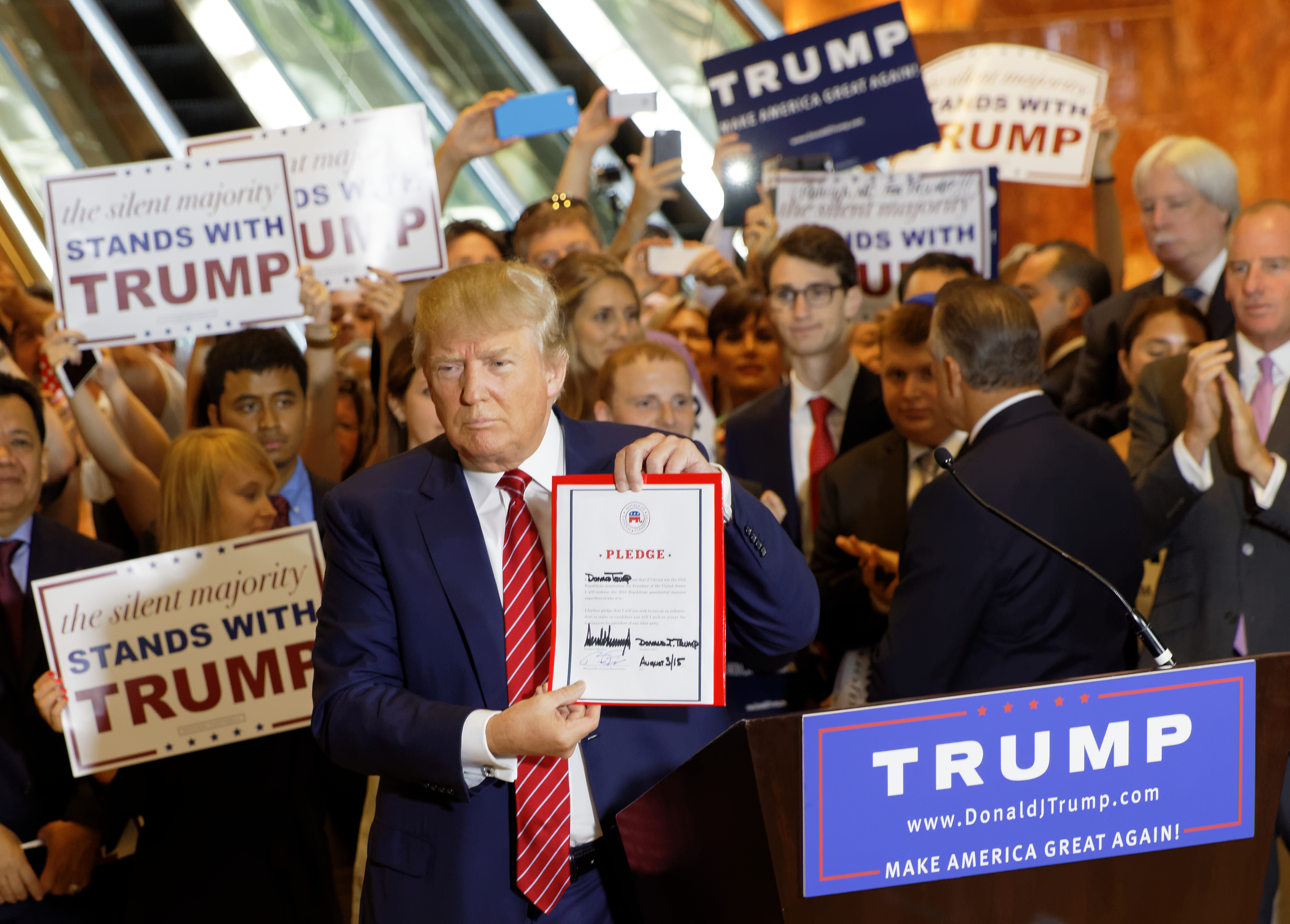
Trump signs the Republican loyalty pledge promising to support the candidate nominated by the party and to not run as a third-party candidate, (Note: Recent historical examples: Johnson'12/Roemer'12/Goode'12, Barr'08/Keyes'08, Buchanan'00/Smith'00, Perot'92, Paul'88, and Anderson'80, see also Chafee'16.) if he failed to clinch the nomination.

Following his June 2015 announcement, Trump traveled to several early primary states, including Iowa and New Hampshire, to campaign ahead of the 2016 Republican primaries. By early July 2015, Trump was campaigning in the West, giving rallies and speeches in Las Vegas and Los Angeles. On July 23, he visited the Mexican border and planned to meet with border guards. The meeting did not take place due to the intervention of the labor union of the U.S. Customs and Border Protection guards.

In July, the Federal Election Commission released details of Trump's wealth and financial holdings, which he had submitted to them when he became a Republican presidential candidate. The report showed assets above $1.4 billion and outstanding debts of at least $265 million. Shortly afterwards, Trump's campaign released a statement stating that his net worth is over $10 billion, although Forbes estimated it to be $4.5 billion. On August 6, 2015, the first Republican primary debate took place on Fox News. During the debate, Trump refused to rule out a third-party candidacy. Eventually, in September 2015, Trump signed a pledge promising his allegiance to the Republican Party.

On August 21, 2015, the Federal Election Commission released a list of filings from super PACs backing candidates in the 2016 presidential race, which revealed Trump to be the only major presidential candidate among the Republican candidates who appeared not to have a super PAC supporting his candidacy. Two months later, the Make America Great Again PAC, which had collected $1.74 million and spent around $500,000 on polling, consulting, and other activities, was shut down after The Washington Post revealed multiple connections to the Trump campaign.

=== Border wall and illegal immigration ===
In his announcement speech, Trump promised that he would build "a great, great wall" on the United States–Mexico border, and emphasized that proposal throughout his campaign, falsely stating that the construction of the wall would be paid for by Mexico. Trump proposed a broader crackdown on illegal immigration, and, in a July 6 statement, claimed that the Mexican government was "forcing their most unwanted people into the United States"—"in many cases, criminals, drug dealers, rapists, etc." In his first town hall meeting in Derry, New Hampshire on August 19, 2015, Trump stated: "Day 1 of my presidency, they're getting out and getting out fast." Trump's Republican rival Jeb Bush stated that "Trump is wrong on this" and "to make these extraordinarily kind of ugly comments is not reflective of the Republican Party". While Trump acknowledged that Republican National Committee Chairman Reince Priebus asked him to tone down his rhetoric on immigration reform, he stated that his conversations with the Republican National Committee on the matter were also "congratulatory".

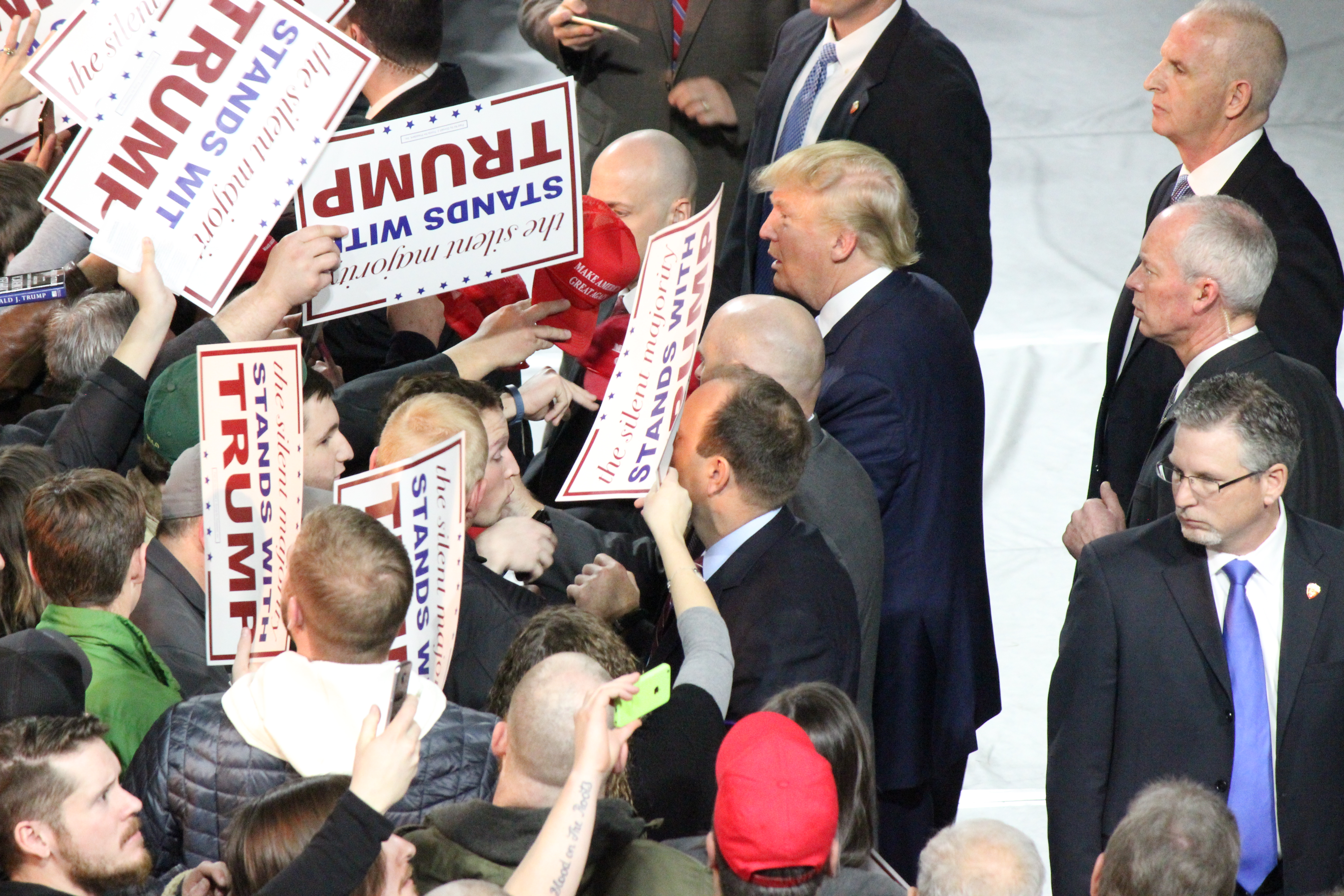
Trump and supporters attend a rally in Muscatine, Iowa, in January 2016

At a July 2015 rally in Phoenix, Arizona, Trump was welcomed by the Maricopa County Sheriff Joe Arpaio, turning over the lectern for part of his speech to a supporter whose child was killed in Los Angeles in 2008 by a Mexican-born gang member. The brother of Kate Steinle, who was murdered in San Francisco by an illegal immigrant, criticized Trump for politicizing his sister's death, while a viral video related to her death produced by a Trump supporter independent of the campaign gave Trump an advantage during the primaries.

Univision announced it would no longer carry broadcasts of the Miss USA Pageant. In response, Trump indicated the matter would be handled by legal action, and followed through by filing a $500 million lawsuit against Univision. The complaint asserted that Univision was attempting to suppress Trump's First Amendment rights by putting pressure on his business ventures. NBC announced it would not air the Miss Universe or Miss USA pageant. Afterwards, the multinational media company Grupo Televisa severed ties with Trump, as did Ora TV, a television network partly owned by Mexican billionaire Carlos Slim.

Macy's announced it would phase out its Trump-branded merchandise. Serta, a mattress manufacturer, also decided to drop their business relationship with Trump. NASCAR ended its sponsorship with Trump by announcing it would not hold its post-season awards banquet at the Trump National Doral Miami.

Among the American public, reactions to Trump's border-wall proposal were polarized by party, with a large majority of Republicans supporting the proposal and a large majority of Democrats against it; overall, a September 2015 poll showed 48 percent of U.S. adults supporting Trump's proposal, while a March 2016 poll showed 34 percent of U.S. adults supporting it.

=== Temporary Muslim ban proposal ===
In remarks made following the November 2015 Paris attacks, Trump stated that he would support a database for tracking Muslims in the United States and expanded surveillance of mosques. Trump's support for an American Muslim database "drew sharp rebukes from his Republican presidential rivals and disbelief from legal experts."

On December 7, 2015, in response to the 2015 San Bernardino attack, Trump further called for a temporary ban on any Muslims entering the country. He issued a written statement saying, "Donald J. Trump is calling for a total and complete shutdown of Muslims entering the United States until our country's representatives can figure out what is going on," which he repeated at subsequent political rallies.

The next day, December 8, 2015, the Pentagon issued a statement of concern, stating Trump's remarks could strengthen the resolve of the Islamic State of Iraq and the Levant (ISIL). The Prime Minister of the United Kingdom, David Cameron, and the Prime Minister of France, Manuel Valls, both issued statements in response to Trump's press release condemning him. Trump was also criticized by leading Republican Party figures, including Republican National Committee chairman Reince Priebus.

Following Trump's controversial comments on Muslim immigration, a petition was begun on the British Parliament's e-petition website, calling on the UK government's Home Secretary to bar him from entering the country. The total number of signatures exceeded the required half-million threshold to trigger a parliamentary debate. On January 18, the UK's House of Commons debated whether to ban Trump from the country; however, while some in the House condemned Trump's remarks and described them as "crazy" and "offensive", most were opposed to intervening in the electoral process of another country, and a vote was not taken.

Trump later appeared to modify his position on Muslims. In May he stated that his proposed ban was "just a suggestion". In June he stated that the temporary ban would apply to people originating from countries with a proven history of terrorism against the United States or its allies. He also commented that it "wouldn't bother me" if Muslims from Scotland entered the United States.

Trump caused further controversy when he recounted an apocryphal story about how U.S. general John J. Pershing shot Muslim rebels with pig's blood-dipped bullets in order to deter them during the Moro Rebellion. His comments were strongly denounced by the Council on American-Islamic Relations.

== Primary front-runner ==
Trump had high poll numbers during the primaries. A survey conducted by The Economist/YouGov released July 9, 2015, was the first major nationwide poll to show Trump as the 2016 Republican presidential front-runner. A Suffolk/USA Today poll released on July 14, 2015, showed Trump with 17 percent support among Republican voters, with Jeb Bush at 14 percent. A The Washington Post/ABC News poll taken on July 16–19, showed Trump had 24 percent Republican support, over Scott Walker at 13 percent. A CNN/ORC poll showed Trump in the lead at 18 percent support among Republican voters, over Jeb Bush at 15 percent, and a CBS News poll from August 4 showed Trump with 24 percent support, Bush second at 13 percent, and Walker third at 10 percent.

A CNN/ORC poll taken August 13–16, 2015, in the swing states of Florida, Ohio and Pennsylvania showed Trump ahead of, or narrowly trailing Democratic candidate Hillary Clinton in direct match-ups in those states. In Florida, Trump led by two points, and in both Ohio and Pennsylvania, he was within five points of Clinton.

Surveys taken in late 2015 showed Trump polling unfavorably among women and non-white voters, with 64 percent of women viewing Trump unfavorably and 74 percent of non-white voters having a negative view of the candidate, according to a November 2015 ABC News/Washington Post poll. A Public Religion Research Institute survey in November 2015 found that many of his supporters were working-class voters with negative feelings towards migrants (in addition to holding strong financial concerns).

Trump's status as the consistent front-runner for the Republican nomination led to him being featured on the cover of Time magazine in August 2015, with the caption: "Deal with it."

== Caucuses and primaries ==
Trump campaign logo during the primaries and prior to selection of Mike Pence as running mate

Percentage of vote received by Trump by state or territory. 0.0–19.9% 20.0–29.9% 30.0–39.9% 40.0–49.9% 50.0–59.9% 60.0–69.9% 70.0–79.9% 80.0%+

In the lead-up to the Iowa caucus, poll averages showed Trump as the front-runner with a roughly four percent lead. Ted Cruz came in first in the vote count, ahead of Trump. Cruz, who campaigned strongly among evangelical Christians, was supported by church pastors that coordinated a volunteer campaign to get out the vote. Before the Iowa vote, an email from the Cruz campaign falsely implied that Ben Carson was about to quit the race, encouraging Carson's supporters to vote for Cruz instead. Trump later posted on Twitter, "Many people voted for Cruz over Carson because of this Cruz fraud", and wrote, "Ted Cruz didn't win Iowa, he stole it."

Following his loss in Iowa, Trump rebounded in the New Hampshire primary, coming in first place with 35 percent of the vote, the biggest victory in a New Hampshire Republican primary since at least 2000. Trump "tapped into a deep well of anxiety among Republicans and independents in New Hampshire, according to exit polling data", running strongest among voters who feared "illegal immigrants, incipient economic turmoil and the threat of a terrorist attack in the United States". Trump commented that in the run-up to the primary, his campaign had "learned a lot about ground games in a week".

This was followed by another wide victory in South Carolina, furthering his lead among the Republican candidates. He won the Nevada caucus on February 24 with a landslide 45.9 percent of the vote, his biggest victory yet; Marco Rubio placed second with 23.9 percent.

By May 2016, Trump held a commanding lead in the number of state contests won and in the delegate count. After Trump won the Indiana contest, Cruz dropped out of the race. He had called Indiana a pivotal opportunity to stop Trump from clinching the nomination. Following Trump's Indiana win, Republican National Committee Chairman Reince Priebus, among others, called Trump the party's presumptive nominee, though he noted that Trump still needed more delegates to clinch the nomination.

After becoming the presumptive Republican nominee, Trump said regarding the Republican primaries: "You've been hearing me say it's a rigged system, but now I don't say it anymore because I won. It's true. Now I don't care."

== Rallies and crowds ==
Trump held large rallies during his campaign, routinely packing arenas and high school gymnasiums with crowds. A Trump rally on July 11, 2015, in Phoenix, Arizona, Trump was introduced by Maricopa County Sheriff Joe Arpaio. During his speech, Trump invoked Richard Nixon's "silent majority" speech, saying "The silent majority is back." In the final month of his campaign, Donald Trump used the phrase "drain the swamp" in his rallies, pledging his supporters to "make our government honest once again." Trump said he originally "hated" the phrase, but when people reacted positively to it, he began "saying it like I meant it".

During the primaries, the Trump campaign sometimes required all attendants at its rallies to take a loyalty oath. Fellow candidate Ted Cruz likened it pledging to a King.

=== Violence, protests and expulsions ===
Trump rally at UIC Pavilion in Chicago on March 11, 2016, immediately after news of Trump's cancellation of attendance of the event

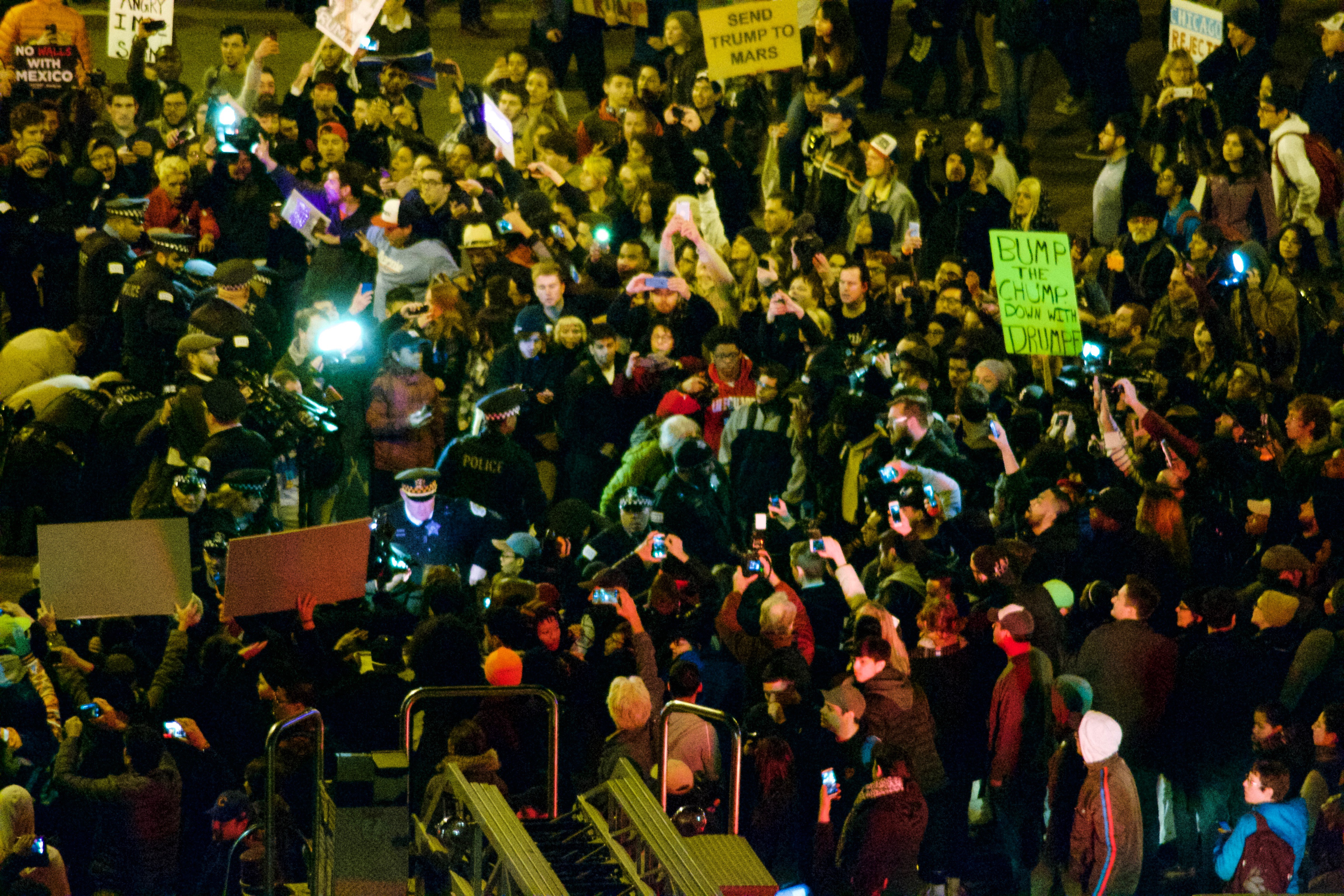
Anti-Trump protesters outside arena as Chicago rally is shut down on March 11, 2016

There were verbal and physical confrontations between Trump supporters and protesters at Trump's events, some committed by supporters and others by anti-Trump demonstrators. Some protesters were asked to leave, removed by security, or arrested for trespassing at Trump's events. Additionally, there were incidents near Trump properties related to the campaign.

On several occasions in late 2015 and early 2016, Trump was accused of encouraging violence and escalating tension at campaign events. Prior to November he used to tell his rallies "Get 'em (protesters) out, but don't hurt 'em." But in November 2015, Trump said of a protester in Birmingham, Alabama, "Maybe he should have been roughed up, because it was absolutely disgusting what he was doing." On February 1 in Cedar Rapids, Iowa, he told the crowd there might be tomato-throwing protesters, and urged his audience to "knock the crap out of 'em" if anyone should try. "I promise you, I will pay the legal fees", he added. On February 23, 2016, at a rally in Las Vegas, Trump reacted to a protester by saying "I love the old days—you know what they used to do to guys like that when they were in a place like this? They'd be carried out on a stretcher, folks", adding "I'd like to punch him in the face." On March 9 a Trump supporter was charged with assault after he sucker-punched a protester who was being led out of the event. When Trump was asked if he would pay the man's legal fees, Trump said he was "looking into it", although he "doesn't condone violence in any shape". The local sheriff's office considered filing charges against Trump for "inciting a riot" at that event, but concluded there was not sufficient evidence to charge him.

== Presumptive nominee and party reaction ==
On May 3, Trump became the presumptive nominee of the Republican Party after his victory in Indiana and the withdrawal of the last competitors, Ted Cruz and John Kasich, from the race.

Some Republicans declined to support Trump's candidacy, including former primary rival Jeb Bush (who announced that he would not vote for Trump) and Bush's father and brother, former presidents George H. W. Bush and George W. Bush (who announced that they would not endorse Trump). Paul Ryan announced that he was "not ready" to endorse Trump for the presidency. On May 8, Trump's campaign said that he would not rule out a bid to remove Ryan from his post as chairman of the 2016 Republican National Convention, and the following day, Ryan said that he would step down as convention chairman if asked by Trump to do so. On June 2, Ryan announced that he would vote for Trump.

Senator Jeff Sessions was the first sitting U.S. senator to endorse Trump. Other prominent Republicans, such as Senate Majority Leader Mitch McConnell, governors Bobby Jindal and Rick Perry, and former senator and Republican presidential nominee Bob Dole, followed. McConnell stated, "The right-of-center world needs to respect the fact that the primary voters have spoken."

On May 26, Trump secured his 1,238th delegate, achieving a majority of the available delegates.

In June 2016, two groups of Republican delegates opposed to Trump emerged. Free the Delegates sought to change the convention rules to include a 'conscience clause' that would allow delegates bound to Trump to vote against him. Delegates Unbound engaged in "an effort to convince delegates that they have the authority and the ability to vote for whomever they want". According to the group, "There is no language supporting binding in the temporary rules of the convention, which are the only rules that matter" and "barring any rules changes at the convention, delegates can vote their conscience on the first ballot."

== General election campaign staff ==
On May 9, Trump named New Jersey Governor Chris Christie to head a team to plan the transition of the presidency in the event of a Trump victory. In November 2016, after calls for his impeachment as Governor and felony convictions in U.S. federal court for high-ranking members of his staff in the Bridgegate scandal, Christie was dropped by Trump as leader of the transition team, in favor of Mike Pence.

On June 20, 2016, Trump fired his campaign manager Corey Lewandowski, reportedly in response to lagging fundraising and campaign infrastructure (as well as power struggles within the campaign, according to multiple GOP sources). Paul Manafort, Trump's campaign chairman, who was brought in during the primary to prepare for a contested convention, assumed the role of chief strategist.

Kevin Kellems, a veteran GOP strategist and former aide to Vice President Dick Cheney, resigned from Trump's staff after he was appointed to help inspect the campaign's surrogate operations. Erica Freeman, another aide to Trump who worked with surrogates, also resigned.

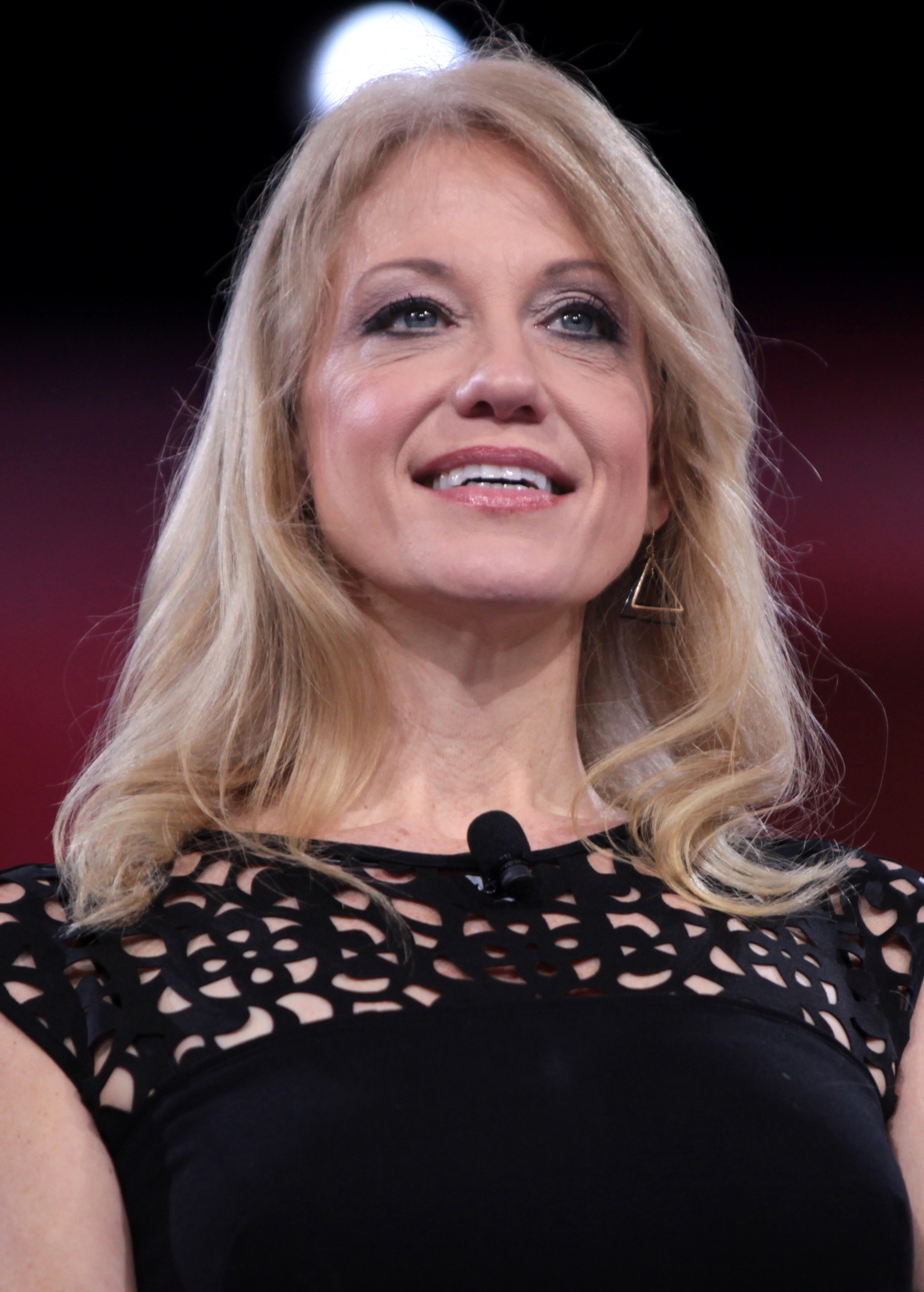
Kellyanne Conway at the Conservative Political Action Conference 2016

In June 2016, Trump hired Jason Miller to assist the communications operation. On July 1, 2016, Trump announced he hired Kellyanne Conway, a veteran GOP strategist and canvasser, for a senior advisory position. Conway, who formerly backed Cruz, was expected to advise Trump on how to better appeal to female voters. Conway had headed a pro-Cruz super PAC funded by hedge-fund tycoon Robert Mercer. After Trump won the Republican presidential nomination, the PAC morphed into the "Defeat Crooked Hillary PAC". When the Trump campaign hired Conway, it referred to her as "widely regarded as an expert on female consumers and voters." Conway became the first woman to run a Republican general election presidential campaign. David Urban took a role as a senior advisor to the campaign, focusing on the effort to win Pennsylvania.

On August 17, 2016, Trump announced Breitbart News executive chairman Stephen Bannon as the campaign chief executive and promoted Conway to campaign manager, replacing Paul Manafort who had been handling those duties unofficially. Manafort had been criticized in the media for connections to former Ukrainian President Viktor Yanukovich and other dictators. Although Manafort initially retained the title of campaign chairman, he resigned from this position on August 19, 2016.

In September 2016, Trump hired David Bossie, longtime president of the conservative advocacy group Citizens United, to be his new deputy campaign manager.

== Selection of running mate ==
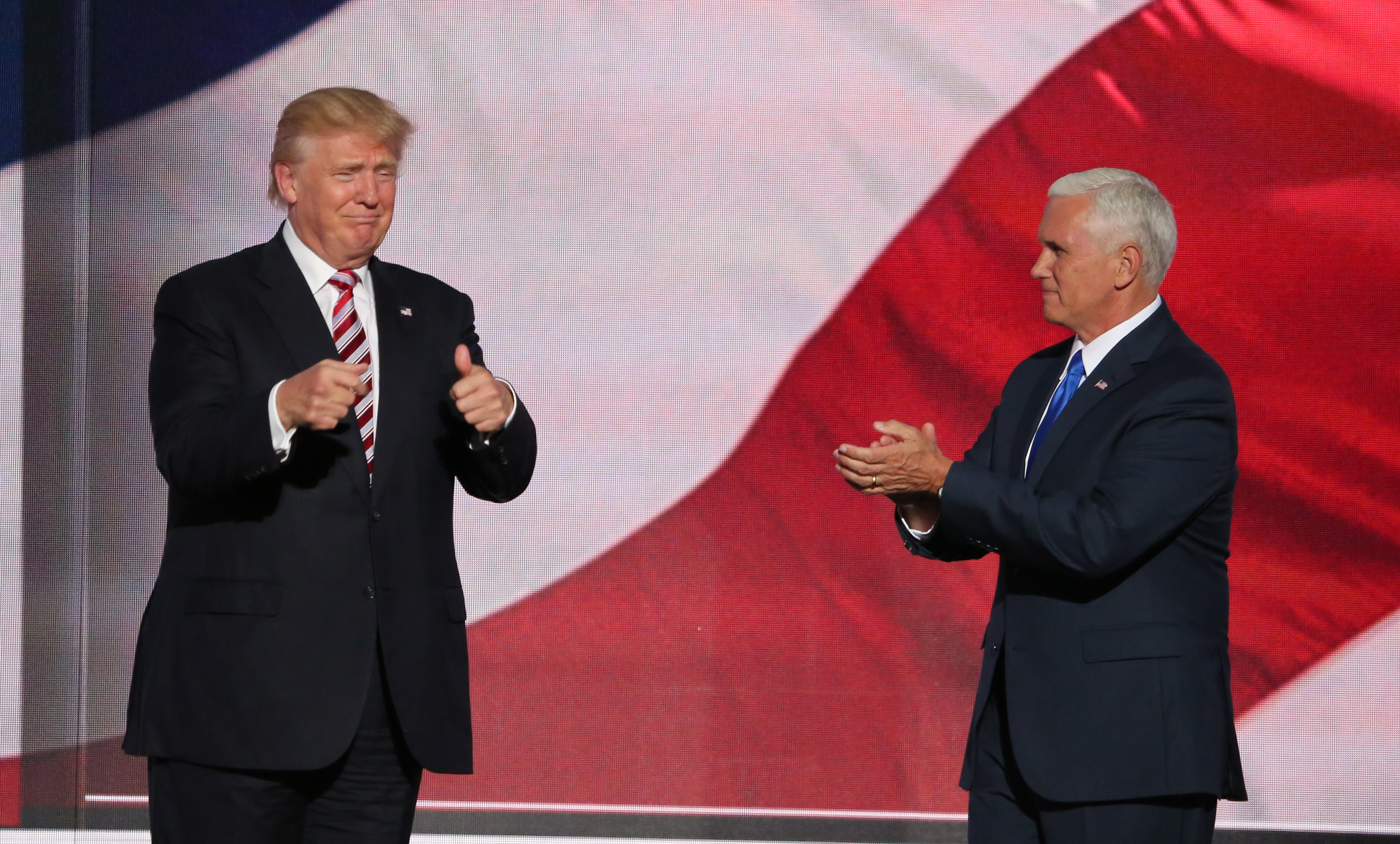
Candidate Trump and running mate Mike Pence at the Republican National Convention, July 2016

From early to mid-July, various media outlets widely reported that Trump's short list for his pick as vice president and running mate had narrowed to Indiana governor Mike Pence, New Jersey governor Chris Christie, and former Speaker of the House Newt Gingrich.

On July 15, 2016, Trump officially announced via Twitter that he had chosen Pence to be his running mate. Trump introduced Pence as his running mate at a press conference the next day. Pence formally accepted the nomination on July 20 at the Republican National Convention.

On October 27, 2016, Pence's Boeing 737-700 airplane fishtailed off the runway at LaGuardia Airport in New York during landing. There were no injuries reported among those on board, which included members of the press in the back of the plane. As a result of the accident, Pence cancelled a campaign event that night, though said on Twitter that he would be back campaigning the next day on October 28.

== Presidential debates ==
The first of three presidential debates took place on September 26, at New York's Hofstra University. The moderator was Lester Holt of NBC. A live-TV audience of 84 million viewers set a viewership record for presidential debates. Scientific polls showed that most voters thought Hillary Clinton performed better than Donald Trump in the debate. The second debate was held on October 9, at Washington University in St. Louis, Missouri. The co-moderators were CNN's Anderson Cooper and ABC News's Martha Raddatz. Trump tweeted on Tuesday morning that "every poll" declared him the winner. The final debate took place on the campus of the UNLV in Las Vegas, Nevada on October 19. The moderator was Chris Wallace of Fox News.

== Endorsements ==
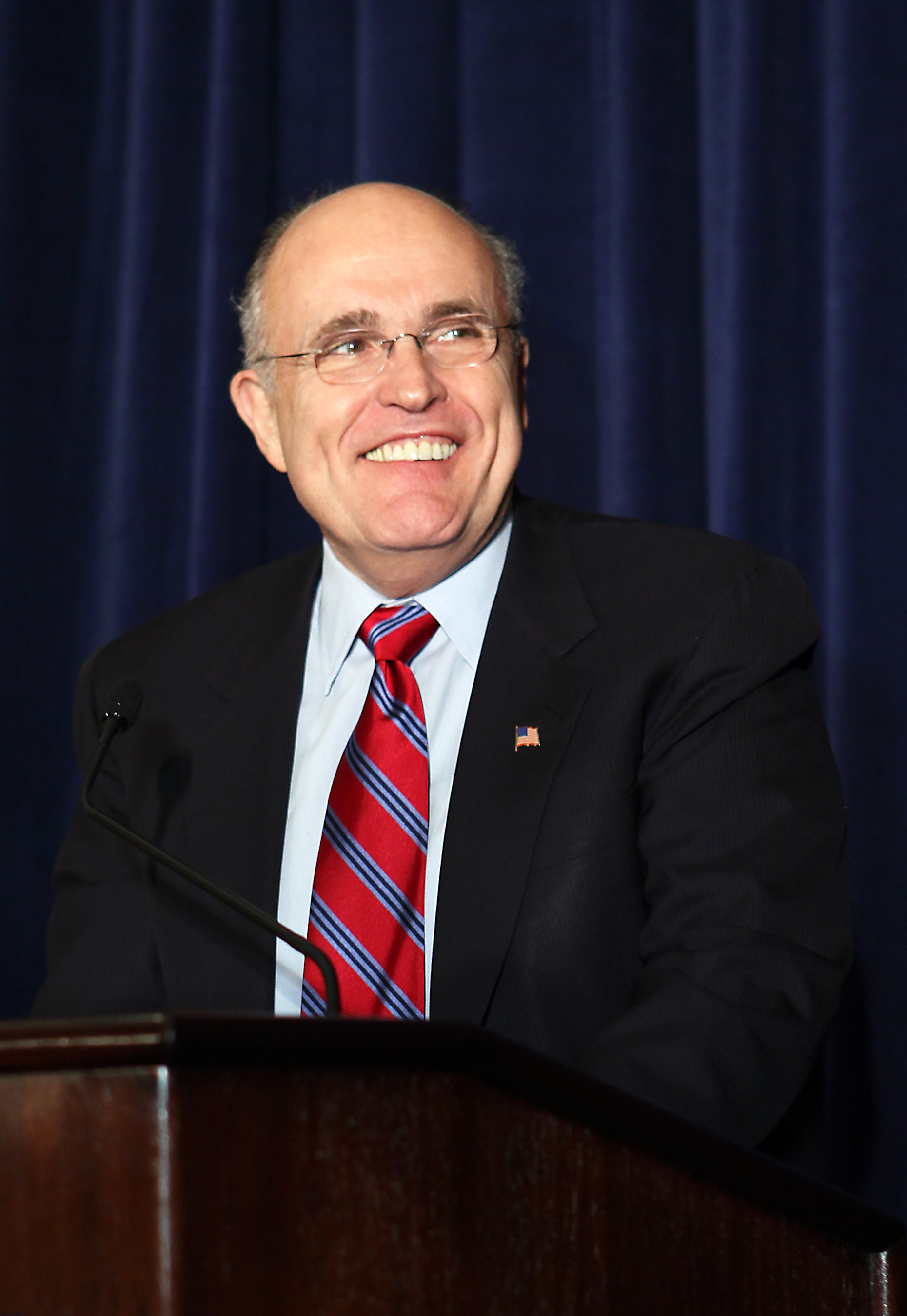
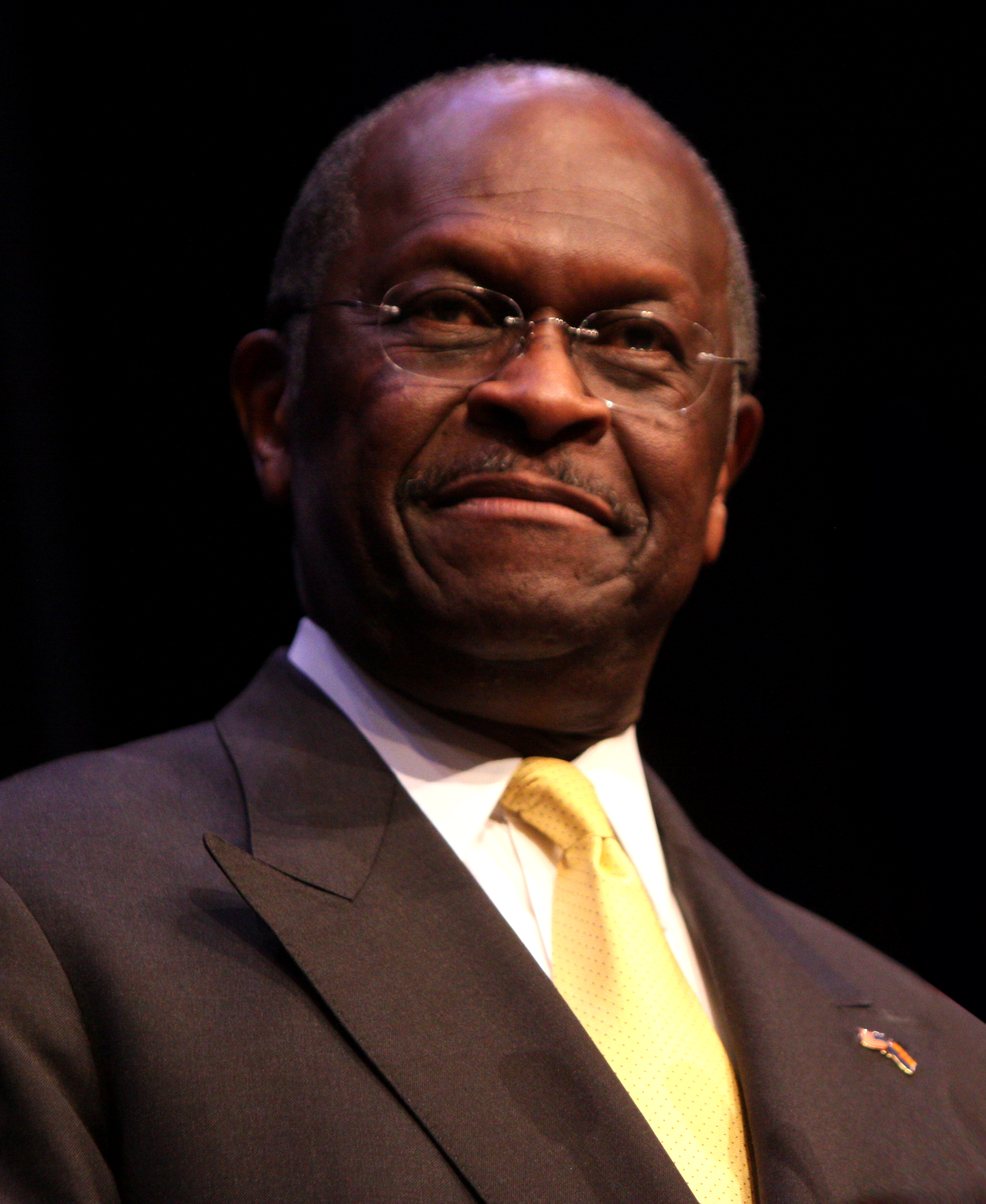
Former Mayor of New York Rudy Giuliani and 2012 presidential candidate Herman Cain endorsed Trump.

The Las Vegas Review-Journal was the first and only major newspaper to endorse Donald Trump's campaign. Many Republican-leaning papers endorsed Clinton or urged readers not to vote for Trump while declining to endorse any other candidate.

The Houston Chronicle, The Cincinnati Enquirer, The Dallas Morning News, and The Arizona Republic editorial boards, which normally endorse Republican candidates, endorsed Hillary Clinton. The New Hampshire Union Leader, which had endorsed the Republican in every election for the last 100 years, endorsed Gary Johnson. Several news reports, including one by Chris Cillizza, political reporter for The Washington Post, compared the 2016 Donald Trump political campaign to The Waldo Moment, a 2013 episode of the Black Mirror TV series; in September 2016, episode writer Charlie Brooker also compared the Trump campaign to the episode and predicted Trump would win.

USA Today, which never had endorsed a candidate in its 34-year history, took sides in the race with an editorial that had declared Trump to be "erratic", described his business career as "checkered", and called him a "serial liar" and "unfit for the presidency". The newspaper, however, said the "editorial does not represent unqualified support for Hillary Clinton."

Viktor Orban, the PM of Hungary, was the first foreign leader to endorse Trump before the elections.

== Results ==
Electoral college results of the 2016 presidential election; Trump won a majority of 304 votes

Trump declared victory over Clinton on November 9.

As the results came in on election night, November 8, 2016, Trump won in multiple states that had been predicted to go to Clinton. In the early morning hours of November 9, media sources declared Trump the winner of the presidency, crediting him with 279 electoral college votes where 270 were needed to win. Clinton then phoned Trump to concede and to congratulate him on his victory, whereupon Trump gave a victory speech. His victory was widely described as a "stunning upset", since most pre-election polling had predicted a Clinton win. Trump became the first Republican presidential candidate since the 1980s to win the Rust Belt states of Pennsylvania, Michigan, and Wisconsin. (Note: Trump became the first Republican presidential candidate to win the Rust Belt states of Pennsylvania and Michigan since George H. W. Bush in 1988; Trump also became the first Republican presidential candidate to win the Rust Belt state of Wisconsin since Ronald Reagan in 1984.)

As of November 28, Trump is projected to win 306 electoral votes compared to 232 for Clinton. In the nationwide popular vote, Clinton received over 2.8 million (2.1%) more votes than Trump. Trump is the fifth presidential candidate in U.S. history to win the election but lose the popular vote. This is the biggest-ever raw-vote loss in the popular vote for a candidate who won the election, though not by percentage. The previous non-incumbent Republican to win the presidency, George W. Bush in 2000, had held the record with a loss of 543,895 votes.

Trump's share of the electoral vote was 56.9%; in a ranking of electoral votes in the 54 presidential elections since the ratification of the Twelfth Amendment in 1804 it is in 44th place.

== Post-election ==
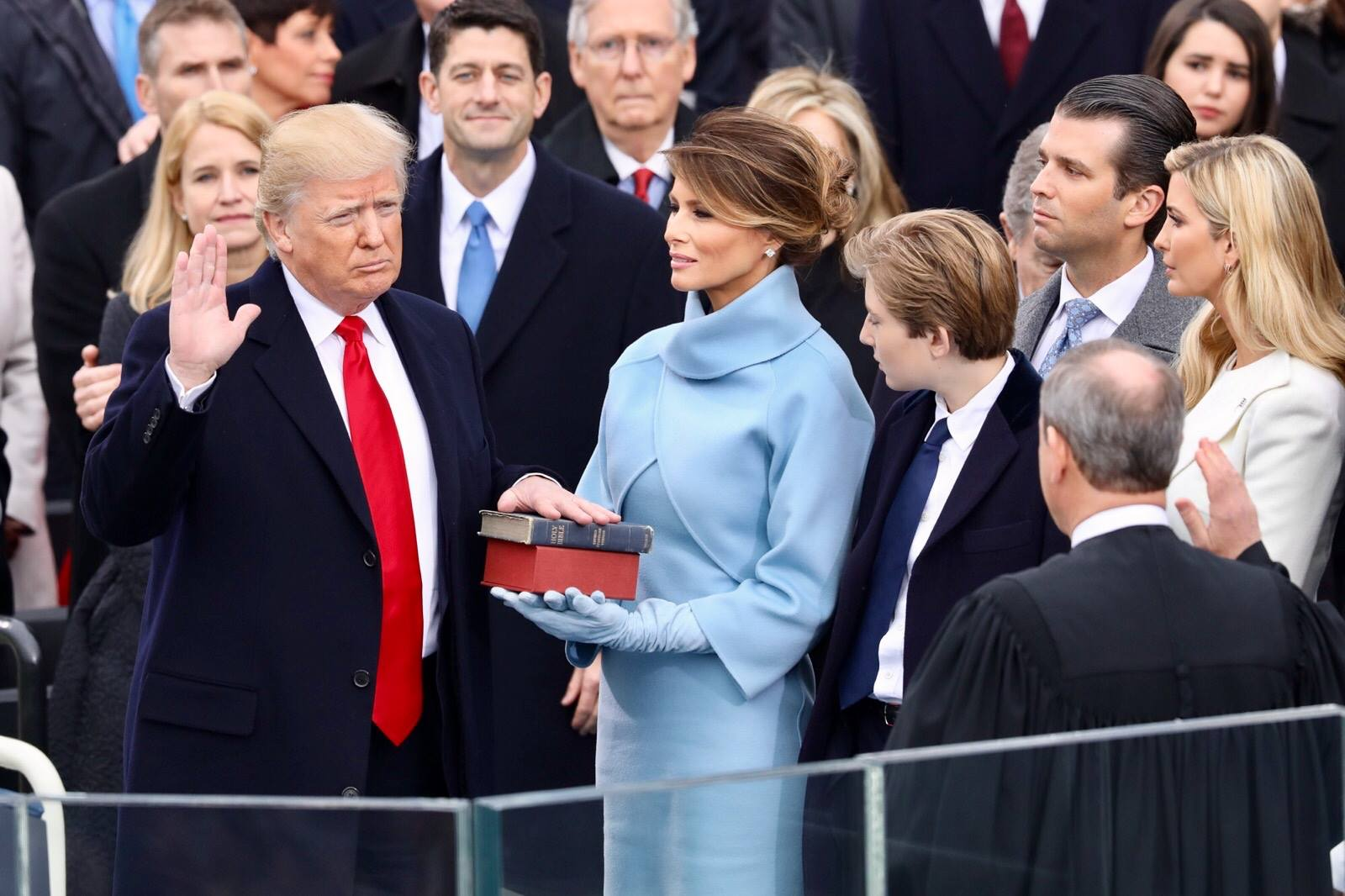
Trump being inaugurated on January 20, 2017 as the 45th president of the United States

In an unprecedented move, Trump kept his presidential campaign organization in place after he assumed the presidency. As of January 2017 the campaign office in Trump Tower continued with a staff of about ten people, led by Michael Glassner. It focused on data-building and fundraising for a 2020 re-election campaign.

In May 2017, a senior aide to the campaign, Healy Baumgardner-Nardone, disclosed that she was lobbying for the Malaysian government. The former campaign manager, Corey Lewandowski, left a lobbying firm he had co-founded after the election, because it solicited in Eastern Europe.

A joint report published in June 2019 by the Center for Public Integrity, NBC News and CNBC detailed that the 2016 and 2020 Trump campaigns have yet to pay bills totaling over $800,000 to 10 city governments for costs incurred to ensure public safety with regard to Trump campaign rallies. The rallies took place from January 2016 to August 2016 in Burlington, Vermont, Tucson, Arizona, Eau Claire, Wisconsin, Spokane, Washington, Green Bay, Wisconsin, and from September 2018 to February 2019 in Billings, Montana, Erie, Pennsylvania, Lebanon, Ohio, Mesa, Arizona, and El Paso, Texas.

== Russian interference in the 2016 election ==
Starting in 2015, several allied foreign intelligence agencies began reporting secret contacts between Trump campaigners and known or suspected Russian agents in multiple European cities. In November 2016, Russian Deputy Foreign Minister Sergei Ryabkov contradicted Trump's denials by confirming the Trump campaign had been in contact with Russia, stating in a 2016 Interfax news agency interview: "Obviously, we know most of the people from his entourage," adding "I cannot say that all of them but quite a few have been staying in touch with Russian representatives."

Beginning on July 31, 2016, the campaign became the target of a covert FBI investigation known as Crossfire Hurricane, as well as several other independent FBI sources, to discover if any coordination existed between the campaign and Russia or other criminal activity occurred. On January 6, 2017, the United States government's intelligence agencies concluded that the Russian government interfered in the 2016 United States elections. A joint U.S. intelligence community review ordered by President Barack Obama stated with high confidence that "Russian President Vladimir V. Putin ordered an influence campaign in 2016 aimed at the US presidential election. Russia's goals were to undermine public faith in the US democratic process, denigrate Secretary Clinton, and harm her electability and potential presidency," and boost the candidacy of Donald Trump.

Investigations about potential collusion between the Trump campaign and Russian officials were started by the FBI, the Senate Intelligence Committee, and the House Intelligence Committee. In May 2017, Acting Attorney General Rod Rosenstein appointed FBI Director Robert S. Mueller III as Special Counsel to oversee an investigation into "any links and/or coordination between the Russian government and individuals associates with the campaign of President Donald Trump; and (ii) any matters that arose or may arise directly from the investigation." Many suspicious links between Trump associates and Russian officials were identified by the FBI, Special counsel and several United States congressional committees, as part of their investigations into the Russian interference in the 2016 United States elections. As of July 2018, the Mueller investigation obtained indictments or guilty pleas from 32 individuals and three Russian companies.

As president, Trump has repeatedly rejected the conclusions of the U.S. intelligence agencies that the Russian government interfered in the election and has also denied allegations that his campaign colluded with Russia.

The March 2019 report issued by special council Robert Mueller at the conclusion of his investigations did not conclude that President Trump, whether as a candidate or President elect, had committed a crime, but described multiple instances of possible obstruction of justice and left it up to Congress to deal with the issue.

== Political positions ==
Trump has stated that he is a "conservative Republican". Commentators Norman Ornstein and Bill Kristol labeled his collective political positions as "Trumpism". The Wall Street Journal used the term in drawing parallels with populist movements in China and the Philippines. From an external political perspective, German Vice Chancellor Sigmar Gabriel termed Trump a right-wing populist similar to Marine Le Pen, Geert Wilders or Silvio Berlusconi. The New York Times Magazine analogized Trump's positions with that of past populist figures George Wallace and George McGovern in terms of the us-versus-them approaches.

=== Opposition to trade agreements ===
Opposition to international trade agreements on the grounds that they hurt American workers by moving jobs abroad was one of the central themes of Trump's campaign. Trump's chief trade advisor during the campaign was Peter Navarro.

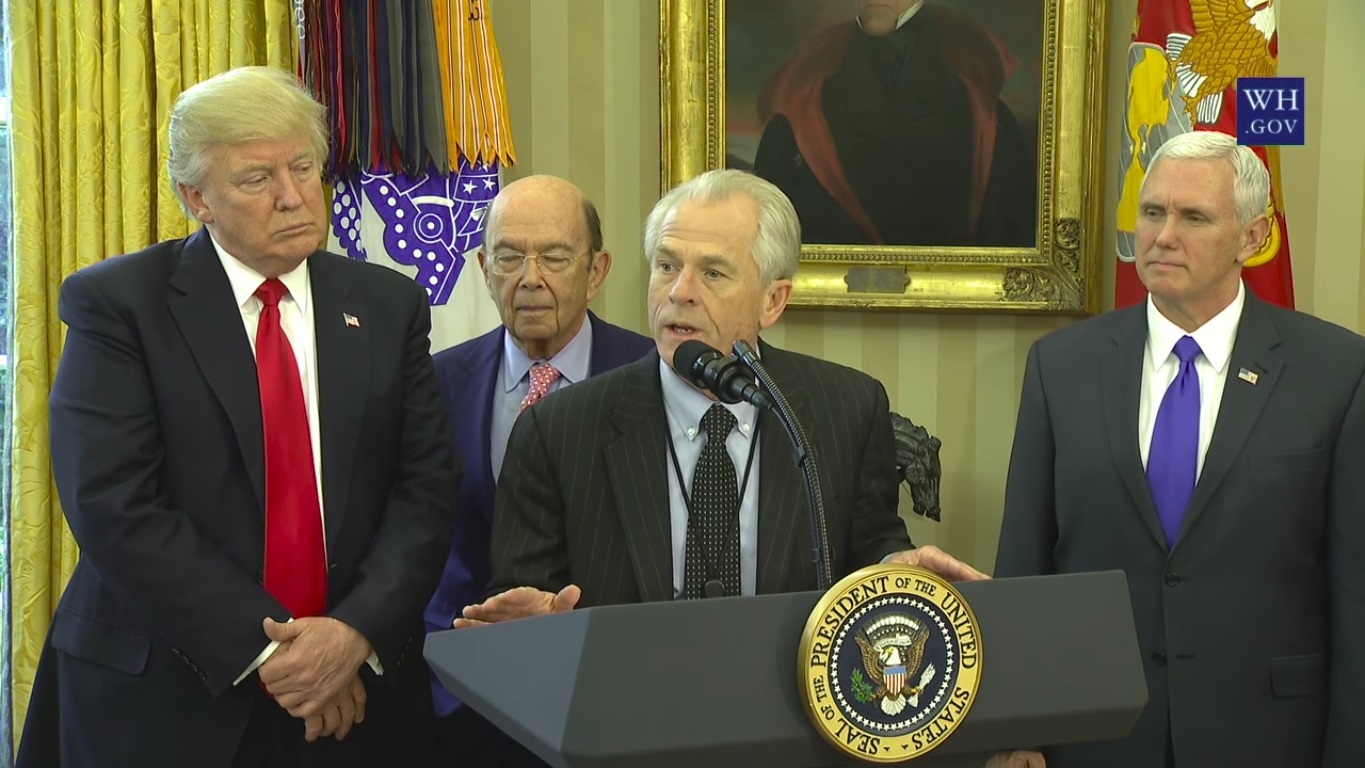
Director Peter Navarro addresses President Donald Trump's promises to American people, workers, and domestic manufacturers (Declaring American Economic Independence on June 28, 2016) in the Oval Office with Vice President Mike Pence and Secretary of Commerce Wilbur Ross before President Trump signs Executive Orders regarding trade in March 2017

Navarro and the international private equity investor Wilbur Ross authored a short economic endorsement plan for the Donald Trump presidential campaign in September 2016 which was published without academic references and criticized in the press. Navarro was invited to be an adviser after Jared Kushner saw on Amazon that he co-wrote Death by China, while he was researching China for Trump. and told when the Tax Policy Center assessed that Trump's economic plan would reduce federal revenues by $6 trillion and reduce economic growth in the long term, Navarro said that the analysis demonstrated "a high degree of analytical and political malfeasance". When the Peterson Institute for International Affairs estimated that Trump's economic plan would cost millions of Americans their jobs, Navarro said that writers at the Peterson Institute "weave a false narrative and they come up with some phony numbers." According to MIT economist Simon Johnson, the economic plan essay authored by Navarro and Wilbur Ross for Donald Trump during the campaign had projections "based on assumptions so unrealistic that they seem to have come from a different planet. If the United States really did adopt Trump's plan, the result would be an immediate and unmitigated disaster." When 370 economists, including nineteen Nobel laureates, signed a letter warning against Donald Trump's stated economic policies in November 2016, Navarro said that the letter was "an embarrassment to the corporate offshoring wing of the economist profession who continues to insist bad trade deals are good for America."

During the campaign, Navarro was given an office on the 14th floor of Trump Tower, where he worked on economic plans that heavily focused on starting a trade war against China. In October 2016, with Wilbur Ross and Andy Puzder, Navarro coauthored the essay "Economic Analysis of Donald Trump's Contract with the American Voter". On December 21, 2016, Navarro was selected by President-elect Donald Trump to head a newly created position, as director of the White House National Trade Council. He endorsed President Trump's trade policy as aiming to create jobs, revive the manufacturing sector, and improve the country's trade balance. He warned that trade deficits could jeopardize U.S. national security by allowing unfriendly nations to encroach on American supply chains. One of his main missions is to focus on behaviors by other countries that he considers abusive, cheating, illegal, and unfair against the U.S.

== Campaign branding ==
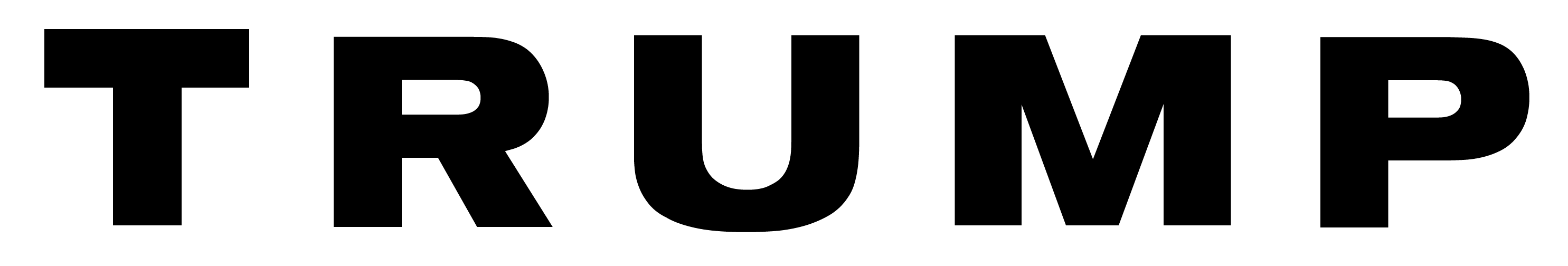
The initial campaign wordmark was featured extensively in campaign merchandise.

The campaign drew heavily on Trump's personal image, enhanced by his previous media exposure. Prior to his presidential bid, The Trump Organization also relied on the 'Trump' surname as a key part of its marketing strategy. Consequently, the 'Trump' name was in widespread use in the U.S. well before the presidential campaign itself started. Due to successful branding and media coverage, Trump soon gained a leverage in the race despite spending comparatively little on advertising himself.

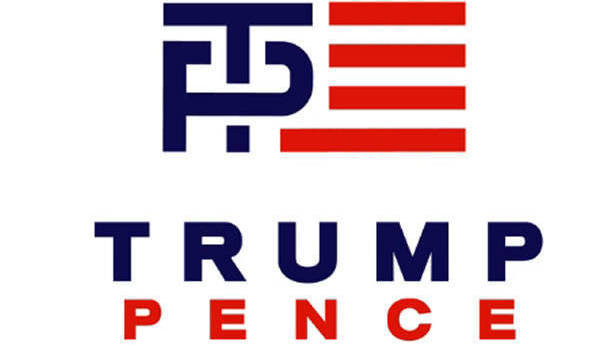
Initial updated Trump campaign logo reflecting the adoption of Mike Pence as Donald Trump's vice-presidential candidate, but later replaced

Before the announcement of Mike Pence as running mate in July 2016, the campaign relied on a wordmark of the 'Trump' surname capitalised and set in the bold Akzidenz-Grotesk typeface. Following the announcement, the campaign unveiled a new logo combining the names of the two candidates by featuring an interlocking 'T' and 'P', formed to create the image of the American flag. The logo became the subject of parodies that interpreted the symbol as being sexually suggestive; the campaign revised the logo shortly afterward to remove the flag and interlocking symbol, leaving the wordmark.

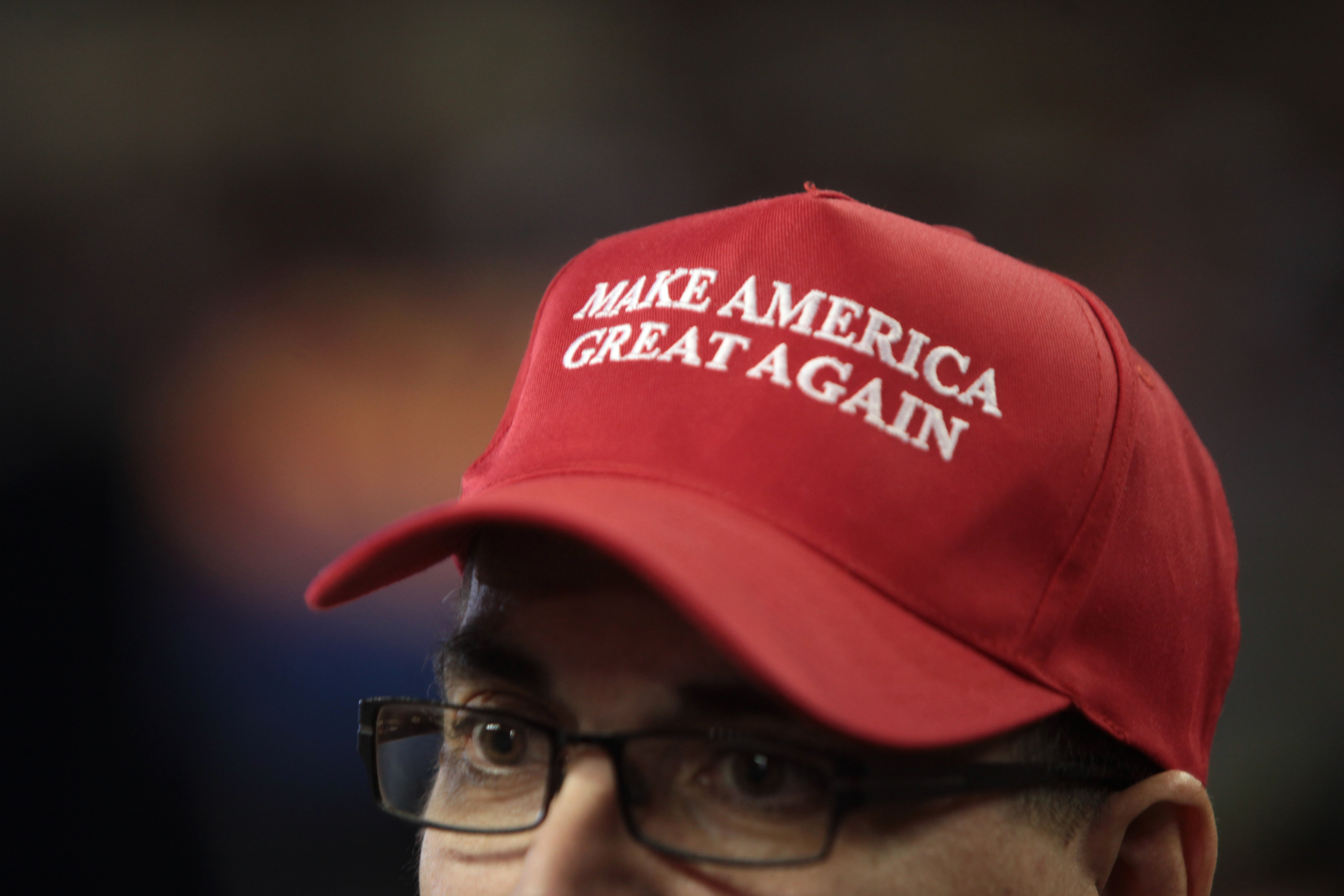
Make America Great Again slogan worn by a Trump supporter

The primary slogan of the Trump campaign, extensively used on campaign merchandise, is Make America Great Again. The red baseball cap with the slogan emblazoned on the front became a symbol of the campaign, and is frequently donned by Trump and his supporters. The hats were so important to the campaign that it spent more money to make them than on polling, consultants, or television advertisements.

In addition, UK big data voter opinion influencer Cambridge Analytics was hired by the Trump campaign in 2016. In March 2018, it was revealed through undercover footage that Cambridge Analytica used seductive women to entice a rival candidate while secretly videotaping the encounter. The firm also sent impostors who acted like wealthy individuals only to give them bribes.

=== Ground game ===
In October 2016, the Trump campaign had 178 field offices compared to Clinton's 489. The Trump campaign's number of field offices lagged far behind those Romney and Obama in 2012. Political science research showed that field offices had a modest positive effect on a candidate's vote share. The Trump campaign was reportedly almost fully reliant on the Republican National Committee for field offices in swing states. As the field offices are organized by state and local Republican parties, they may not have been strategically located in terms of boosting turnout for the Republican presidential candidate.

=== Music ===
During the 2016 campaign, Trump reportedly programmed his own campaign rally playlists. Trump's musical preferences have been well-documented in several of his books. In his book Think Like a Billionaire he states that he returns to favorites like Frank Sinatra and Tony Bennett, while also appreciating a more diverse catalogue including rap artist Eminem and reggae group Toots and The Maytals. The campaign playlist was as diverse, and included the Rolling Stones' "You Can't Always Get What You Want," Queen's "We Are the Champions," the Beatles' "Here Comes the Sun" and Luciano Pavarotti's "Nessun Dorma". The Trump campaign's "warm-up music"—a track played before rallies began with the intention of energizing the crowd—regularly included:

- "Rocket Man" by Elton John
- "Hey Jude" by The Beatles
- "Skyfall" and "Rolling in the Deep" by Adele
- "The Music of the Night" from Andrew Lloyd Webber's The Phantom of the Opera
- "Memory" from Andrew Lloyd Webber's Cats
- "Nessun Dorma" by Pavarotti
- "Don't Stop Believin'" by Journey
- "It's the End of the World as We Know It (And I Feel Fine)" by R.E.M.
- "Rocking in the Free World" by Neil Young

The Trump campaign was publicly criticized for unauthorized use of music by several artists including the Rolling Stones, R.E.M.'s frontman Michael Stipe, Queen's music publisher, and George Harrison's estate, whose music was played at campaign rallies.

== Media coverage ==
Trump spent only a modest amount on advertising during the primary—$10 million through February 2016, far behind opponents such as Jeb Bush ($82 million), Marco Rubio ($55 million), and Ted Cruz ($22 million). Trump benefited from free media more than any other candidate. From the beginning of his campaign through February 2016, Trump received almost $2 billion in free media attention, twice the amount that Hillary Clinton received. Trump earned $400 million alone in the month of February. According to data from the Tyndall Report, which tracks nightly news content, through February 2016, Trump alone accounted for more than a quarter of all 2016 election coverage on the evening newscasts of NBC, CBS and ABC, more than all the Democratic campaigns combined. Observers noted Trump's ability to garner constant mainstream media coverage "almost at will".

In response, a petition to "Stop promoting Donald Trump" accused the media of giving Trump endless airtime for the purpose of increasing viewership and ratings and quickly amassed over 200,000 signatures. The media's coverage of Trump generated some disagreement as to its effect on his campaign. Writing in The Washington Post, John M. Sides argued that Trump's success was because of the mass news coverage, yet a later article in The Washington Post stated that he remained successful in spite of the drop in media attention. On September 21, 2015, Politico said, "blaming the press for the Trump surge neglects the salient fact that so much of the coverage of him has been darkly negative." However, Barry Bennett—senior adviser to Trump—said in response to the high number of interviews Trump has given:

Well the demand is pretty high so it's hard not to do them. And it's free media. And we've literally gotten hundreds of millions of dollars worth of free media. No other candidate can talk when everybody is talking about you. So there's some strategic benefit to it.

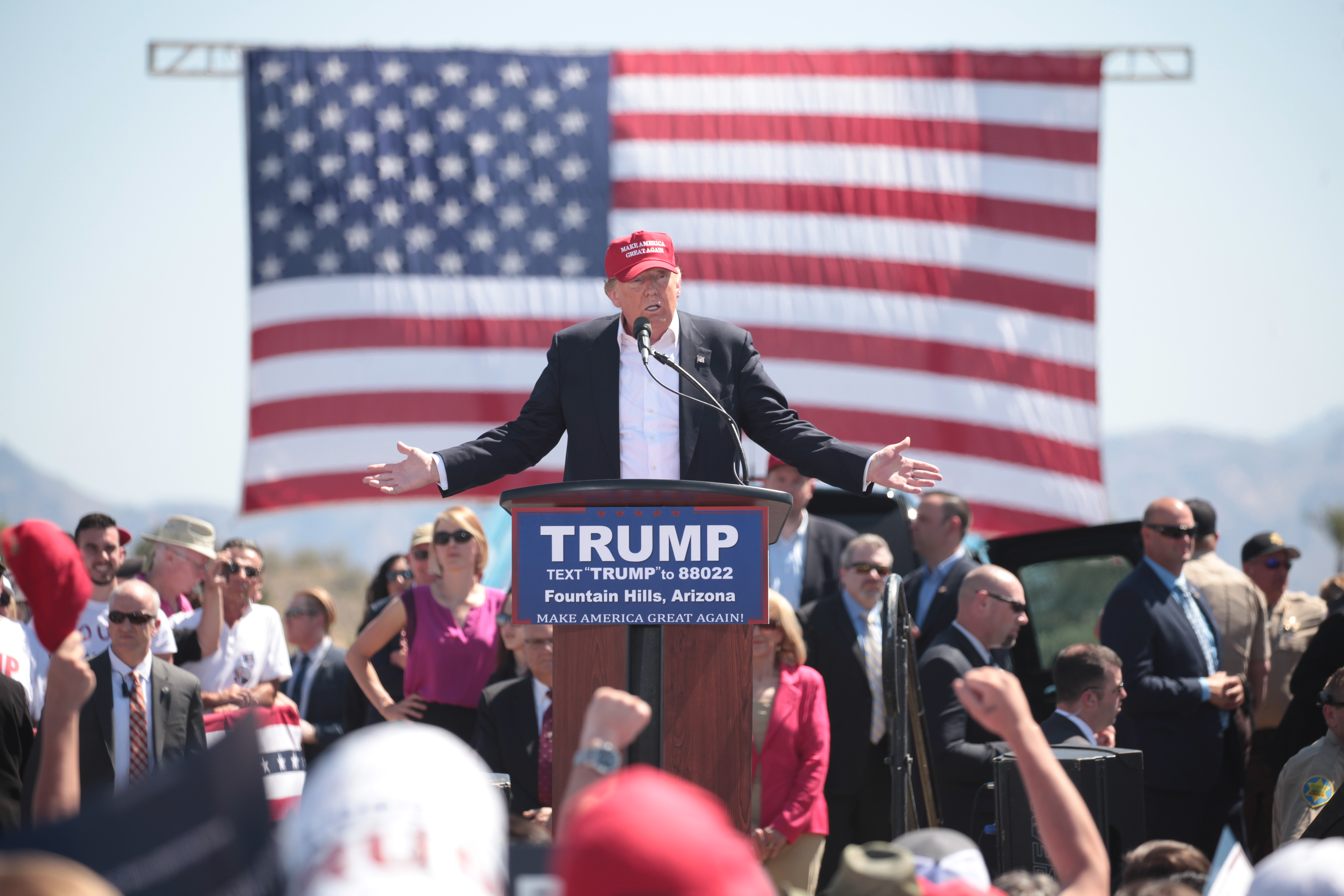
Trump speaks at an Arizona rally in March 2016.

In a January 2016 interview with CBS, Trump said of his campaign's plans to purchase advertising; "I think I'm probably wasting the money. But I'm $35 million under budget. Look, I was going to have 35 or 40 million spent by now. I haven't spent anything. I almost feel guilty ... I'm leading by, as you all say, a lot. You can take the CBS poll. You can take any poll and I'm winning by a lot. I don't think I need the ads. But I'm doing them. I almost feel guilty."

In February 2016, in response to complaints from Trump that Fox News reporter Megyn Kelly would be unfair to him in a Republican primary debate preceding the Iowa caucuses, Fox released a sarcastic statement about Trump, saying they were "surprised he's willing to show that much fear", regarding Kelly. Trump responded by criticizing the "wise-guy press release" and withdrew from the debate, instead hosting a competing event in the state designed to raise money for wounded veterans on the day of the debate. In a November 2019 court settlement, Trump was ordered to pay a $2 million (~$2.48 million in 2025) fine for misusing his Trump Foundation for political and business purposes. In the settlement, Trump acknowledged that the veterans fundraiser had actually been a campaign event and the $2.8 million in raised funds were placed under the full control of his campaign.

Trump frequently criticized the media for writing what he alleged to be false stories about him and referred to them as being the "worst people" and he has called upon his supporters to be "the silent majority", apparently referencing the media. At a rally in Fort Worth, Texas, in February 2016, Trump stated that if elected he would "open up our libel laws so when they write purposely negative and horrible and false articles, we can sue them and win lots of money". Trump specifically alleged that reporting about him by The New York Times and The Washington Post has included falsehoods. Trump says the media "put false meaning into the words I say", and says he does not mind being criticized by the media as long as they are honest about it.

After Trump won the nomination, historians Fredrik Logevall and Kenneth Osgood noted that, "Hardly a day passes without some columnist comparing Donald J. Trump to Huey Long, Father Coughlin or George Wallace."

A 2018 study found that media coverage of Trump led to increased public support for him during the primaries. The study showed Trump received nearly $2 billion in free media, more than double any other candidate. Political scientist John Sides argued that Trump's polling surge was "almost certainly" due to frequent media coverage of his campaign. Sides concluded "Trump is surging in the polls because the news media has consistently focused on him since he announced his candidacy on June 16".

== Supporter demographics ==
Surveys showed that significant proportions of Trump supporters hold negative views of immigrants, Muslims, and African-Americans. The Pew Research Center found that 69 percent of Trump supporters viewed immigrants as a burden, rather than a benefit, to the U.S., and 64 percent believed that American Muslims should be subject to greater scrutiny solely on the basis of their religion. Reuters found that Trump supporters were more than twice as likely as Clinton supporters to view Islam negatively. Trump supporters were also more likely than supporters of other candidates to hold negative views of African-Americans. Reuters reported that 40–50 percent of Trump supporters viewed African-Americans as being more "lazy", "rude", "violent", or "criminal" than whites, compared to 25–30 percent for Clinton supporters; while 32 percent of Trump supporters believed that African-Americans were less intelligent than whites, compared to 22 percent of Clinton supporters.

University of Massachusetts Amherst researchers, analyzing a national survey of likely Republican primary voters from December 2015, found that having an authoritarian personality and a fear of terrorism were the only two variables among those tested that were statistically significant predictors of Trump support. Another study based on a different survey, conducted by professors at the University of Chicago and University of Minnesota, concluded that Trump supporters were no more authoritarian than supporters of other Republican candidates, but rather were characterized primarily by a strong nationalist identity and a mistrust of experts, intellectuals, and perceived elites.

A geographical study found support for Trump in the Republican primaries was correlated positively with the following factors (in order of statistical strength): (1) proportion of white lacking a high school diploma; (2) ethnicity reported as "American" on the census; (3) living in a mobile home; (4) jobs largely in agriculture, construction, manufacturing or trade; (5) having a history of voting for segregationists such as George Wallace in 1968; and (6) residents born in the United States and being an evangelical Christian.

== Campaign finances ==
=== Primary campaign ===
As of January 31, 2016, the Trump campaign had received $7.5 million in donations from individuals, $250,318 donated directly by Trump himself, and a $17.78-million loan from the candidate. The loaned amount can be repaid to Trump as other donations arrive. According to reports to the FEC, the campaign had $1.9 million on hand as of February 20.

As of March 31, he had raised $48.4 million, spent $46.3 million, and had $2.1 million cash on hand. His total spending including $3.2 million by outside groups, total $49.5 million. As of May 31, he had raised $63.1 million, spent $61.8 million, and had $1.3 million cash on hand. His total spending including $3.0 million by outside groups, total $64.7 million. As of June 30, he had raised $89.0 million, spent $68.8 million, and had $20.2 million cash on hand. His total spending including $7.6 million by outside groups, total $76.4 million.

On June 23, Trump announced that he was forgiving $50 million in loans that he had made to his campaign for the primary. His campaign refused to release evidence to the press that would prove that he had forgiven these loans.

In October 2015 Trump had said: "I am self-funding my campaign and therefore I will not be controlled by the donors, special interests and lobbyists who have corrupted our politics and politicians for far too long. I have disavowed all super PACs, requested the return of all donations made to said PACs, and I am calling on all presidential candidates to do the same." Politifact reports that Trump's claims that he is "self-funding" his campaign are "half-true." By the end of 2015, Trump's campaign had raised $19.4 million, with almost $13 million (about 66 percent) coming in the form of a loan from Trump himself and the remainder (34 percent) coming from others' contributions. The announcement came a day after a main super PAC backing Trump closed amid scrutiny about its relationship to the campaign itself. Although Trump attended at least two Make America Great Again Super PAC fundraising events, including one at the home of his daughter Ivanka's in-laws, he later said he never gave his endorsement to the super PAC or any of the other eight super PACs supporting his run. In addition to a $100,000 donation from Ivanka Trump's mother-in-law, the Make America Great Again super PAC accepted $1 million in seed money from casino mogul and longtime Trump business partner Phil Ruffin who, according to FEC filings, gave the money just two weeks after the super PAC was established; the super PAC spent about $500,000 on polling, consulting, and legal expenses before shutting down in the wake of The Washington Post's coverage.

=== General election campaign ===
According to Bloomberg News, Trump's general election campaign raised over $500 million, roughly half the sum raised by the Clinton campaign. By October 19, Trump had "put $56.2 million of his own [money] into the campaign, leaving him with scant time to put in the rest of the $100 million he's pledged to spend."

After becoming the presumptive nominee in early May, the Trump campaign announced that it would be seeking large donations for the general election, and that Trump would not be self-funding his campaign in the general election. By the end of May, Trump was reported to have had $1.3 million available for his campaign, while Clinton had $42 million.

Wall Street banker Steven Mnuchin was named finance chair of the Trump campaign in May 2016. In May 2016, the campaign established the Trump Victory Committee to enable joint fundraising with the Republican National Committee and eleven state parties; longtime Republican financiers Diane Hendricks, Woody Johnson, Mel Sembler, Ray Washburne, and Ron Weiser (all of whom backed other candidates during the Republican primary) agreed to serve as vice chairs of the committee.

In May 2016, casino billionaire Sheldon Adelson announced that he would spend $100 million in support of Trump's election. Several months later, the Federal Election Commission had not yet reported any donations to the Trump campaign by Adelson, but Adelson eventually donated $25 million and was the campaign's largest donor.

A number of large-dollar donors who previously backed other candidates, even some who were once mocked by Trump, changed their minds and joined Trump's campaign. Other prominent Republican megadonors, however, more staunchly opposed Trump and opted to "sit out" the election, withholding their support and financial backing. These include Norman Braman, Paul Singer, Seth Klarman, and the Koch Brothers.

Several Super PACs were founded in support of Trump's campaign in the general election, including Great America PAC, Committee for American Sovereignty, and Rebuilding America Now. Vice presidential nominee Mike Pence and former Trump campaign manager Paul Manafort both endorsed Rebuilding America Now, and Trump agreed to headline fundraising events for the organization.

== Controversies ==
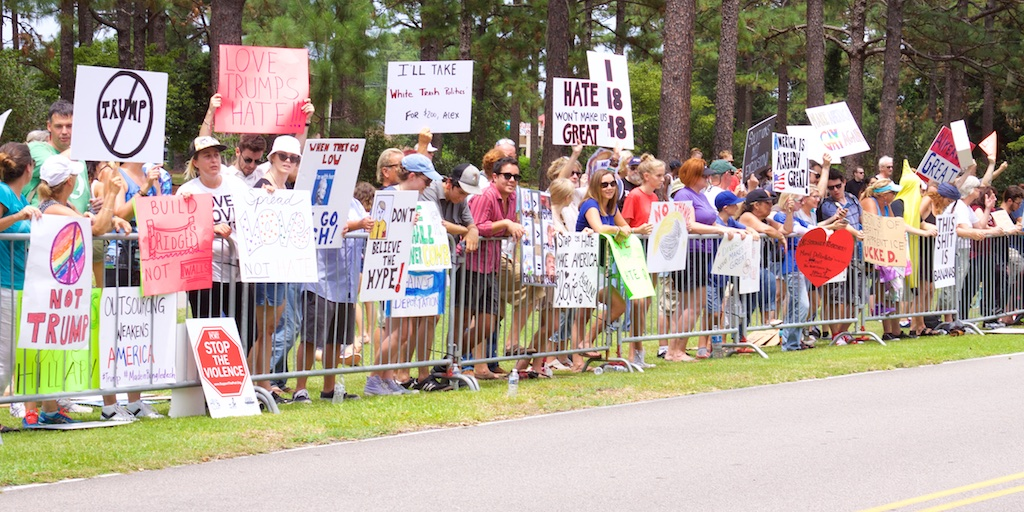
Supporters and protesters outside the August 9, 2016, campaign event at UNC-Wilmington's Trask Coliseum in Wilmington, North Carolina

=== Comment about the Second Amendment and Hillary Clinton ===
At a campaign stop in Wilmington, North Carolina, on August 9, Donald Trump said that Hillary Clinton wanted to "essentially abolish the Second Amendment" because of her support for gun control. He said if she nominates judges to the Supreme Court, there would be nothing that could be done about it, and then added, "Although the Second Amendment people, maybe there is. I don't know".

Trump's comment sparked condemnation from various Democrats and Republicans for being perceived as suggesting violence against Clinton or liberal jurists, instead of suggesting political action. Clinton Campaign spokesman Robby Mook released a statement that said, "what Trump is saying is dangerous", and that a person seeking the presidency "should not suggest violence in any way." General Michael Hayden, who is the former head of the CIA, stated that "If someone else had said that outside the hall, he'd be in the back of a police wagon now with the Secret Service questioning him." Secret Service spokesperson Cathy Milhoan said in a statement that the U.S. Secret Service was aware of Trump's comments. The New York Times opinion writer Thomas Friedman condemned Trump's comment, saying "And that, ladies and gentlemen, is how Israeli Prime Minister Yitzhak Rabin got assassinated."

PolitiFact noted that some people saw it as a joke about assassination or a reference to political action, while others took it as a threat. Politifact also noted that the premise behind Trump's remark—that Clinton wants to "abolish the Second Amendment"—was factually false. The Trump campaign responded with a statement that attributed the comment to the great political power that Second Amendment people have. House Speaker Paul Ryan said Trump should clarify what seemed to him a joke gone wrong. Hillary Clinton responded to Trump's comments by saying, "words matter", and that Trump's comments were part of a long line of casual comments from Trump that had "crossed a line."

In September, Trump repeated the false statement that Clinton wanted to abolish the Second Amendment and suggested that Clinton's Secret Service detail disarm themselves and "let's see what happens". The comments were interpreted by many commentators as an incitement to violence.

=== Khizr and Ghazala Khan ===
During the 2016 Democratic National Convention, one of the speakers was Khizr Khan, a Muslim U.S. citizen who immigrated from Pakistan in 1980. Khan is the father of Captain Humayun Khan, a U.S. soldier who was killed in Iraq in 2004 by a suicide bomber, and later awarded the Bronze Star Medal and a Purple Heart. Khan spoke about his son and criticized Trump for his Muslim ban proposals, asking if Trump had ever read the U.S. Constitution, and offering to give him a copy. He stated that Trump had "sacrificed nothing and no one."

The following Sunday on ABC's This Week with George Stephanopoulos, Trump was asked about Khan. Trump replied that Khan was, "you know, very emotional and probably looked like a nice guy to me." Trump went on to wonder why Khizr Khan's wife Ghazala, who stood silently by her husband's side during his speech, did not speak and speculated that she might not have been allowed to speak. (Ghazala later responded by stating that at the time she was too emotional to speak.) When Trump was asked what he had sacrificed for his country, he told Stephanopoulos, "I think I've made a lot of sacrifices. I work very, very hard. I've created thousands and thousands of jobs, tens of thousands of jobs, built great structures. I've had tremendous success." Trump also cited his work on behalf of veterans, including helping build a Vietnam War memorial in Manhattan and raising "millions of dollars" for veterans.

Trump's comments touched off a firestorm of controversy by appearing to belittle the Khans, with public officials and commentators from all sides of the political spectrum arguing that he should show more respect to the parents of a fallen soldier. A Fox News poll found that 69 percent of respondents who were familiar with Trump's comments, including 41 percent of Republicans, felt that Trump's response was "out of bounds". The Khan controversy, along with Trump's initial refusal to endorse Speaker of the House Paul Ryan for re-election, contributed to significant drops in Trump's poll numbers that week.

Trump responded to the criticism on Twitter, stating that Khazir Khan "viciously attacked me" and tweeting: "This story is not about Mr. Khan, who is all over the place doing interviews, but rather RADICAL ISLAMIC TERRORISM and the U.S. Get smart!" Later, Trump released a written statement saying "Captain Humayun Khan was a hero to our country and we should honor all who have made the ultimate sacrifice to keep our country safe", adding "While I feel deeply for the loss of his son, Mr. Khan, who has never met me, has no right to stand in front of millions of people and claim I have never read the Constitution (which is false), and say many other inaccurate things."

When questioned about the Khans during the second presidential debate, Trump claimed that Humayun Khan would be alive had he been president in 2004 and referred to him as an "American hero". The Khans responded by saying that they know that their son is an American hero.

=== Campaign misstatements ===
In December 2015, Politifact named "the many campaign misstatements of Donald Trump" as its "2015 Lie of the Year", noting at the time that 76 percent of Trump statements rated by the factchecking website were rated "Mostly False, False or Pants on Fire", more than any other politician. Norman Ornstein, a scholar at the conservative American Enterprise Institute, said that "Trump came into an environment that was ripe for bombastic, inflammatory, outrageous statements without having to suffer the consequences", citing the rise of partisan media, popular desensitization to inflammatory rhetoric, and "the assault on science and expertise" as contributing factors.

In March 2016, Politico Magazine analyzed 4.6 hours of Trump stump speeches and press conferences over a five-day period and found "more than five dozen statements deemed mischaracterizations, exaggerations, or simply false." Lucas Graves, a professor at the University of Wisconsin–Madison School of Journalism & Mass Communication, observed that Trump often speaks in a suggestive way that makes it unclear what exactly he meant and, in this regard, warned fact checkers "to be really careful ... to pick things that can be factually investigated and that reflect what the speaker was clearly trying to communicate."

=== Praise for authoritarian foreign leaders ===
Trump's frequent praise for foreign leaders accused of being either authoritarian or totalitarian prompted significant criticism from members of both major political parties.

Trump frequently praised Russia's Vladimir Putin, calling him a strong leader, "unlike what we have in this country," "a man so highly respected within his own country and beyond," and wondered if "he will become my new best friend." He continued to praise Putin throughout the campaign, comparing him favorably to Obama, hailing Russia as an ally in fighting ISIS, and downplaying any suggestion that Russia had behaved aggressively in the world. He also dismissed the assertion by U.S. intelligence officials that Russia is responsible for the computer hacking of Democratic party organizations and individuals. Trump called for closer relations with Russia and "has surrounded himself with a team of advisers who have had financial ties to Russia."

In January 2016, Trump commented on North Korean leader Kim Jong-un, first saying he's a "maniac", but then stating "you gotta give him credit" for the "incredible" way he eliminated his opponents to take charge of the country.

During the Republican debate on March 10, 2016, Trump stirred controversy by saying that the Chinese government's 1989 massacre of unarmed civilians in Tiananmen Square was "horrible" and "vicious" but also "shows you the power of strength." When challenged, he said he was not endorsing the massacre and proceeded to characterize the protest as a riot: "I was not endorsing it. I said that is a strong, powerful government that put it down with strength. And then they kept down the riot. It was a horrible thing. It doesn't mean at all I was endorsing it."

At a July 5 campaign rally, Trump again raised controversy by praising Saddam Hussein for being good at killing terrorists, saying Hussein was "a really bad guy" but "you know what he did well? He killed terrorists. He did that so good. They didn't read them the rights. They didn't talk. They were terrorists. It was over." The New York Times said that Trump's descriptions "are not grounded in fact", noting that Saddam Hussein's Iraq itself had been listed as a state sponsor of terrorism. Terrorism expert Peter Bergen defended Trump: "Saddam Hussein repressed terrorist groups, as he did all forms of rebellion and dissent ... Trump's claim that following the fall of Saddam, Iraq has emerged as the 'Harvard' of terrorism is correct because Zarqawi in 2004 merged his terrorist group with al Qaeda to create "Al Qaeda in Iraq," which is the parent organization of today's ISIS." In October Trump said that both Iraq and Libya would be better off if their deposed dictators, Saddam and Muammar Gaddafi, were still in power, and in December he described Saddam's use of poison gas against civilians as "throwing a little gas". His July 5 comments were widely criticized. Speaker of the House Paul Ryan dissociated himself from the remarks, and a spokesman for Hillary Clinton said "Donald Trump's praise for brutal strongmen seemingly knows no bounds."

Asked about the failed 2016 Turkish coup d'état attempt, Trump praised Turkish President Recep Tayyip Erdoğan, saying, "I give great credit to him for being able to turn that around."

Trump has praised Syrian President Bashar al-Assad. During the October 9 debate, Trump stated that he didn't like Assad, but also praised him, Russia, and Iran for their fight against ISIS.

=== Support for fringe or conspiracy theories ===
During his campaign, Trump frequently gave voice to fringe or conspiracy theories. Professor Joseph Uscinski, the co-author of American Conspiracy Theories, writes that Trump made "unabashed" and "deft and almost daily use of ... conspiracy narratives" on the campaign trail. According to political writer Steve Benen, unlike past political leaders, Trump did not keep fringe theories and their supporters at arm's length.

Trump, for example, promoted the discredited belief that vaccines can cause autism unless administered according to a lengthened schedule. He alluded to the unfounded notion that President Obama is secretly a Muslim. Trump also speculated that Supreme Court Justice Antonin Scalia's death by natural causes was murder.

=== Refusal to release tax returns ===
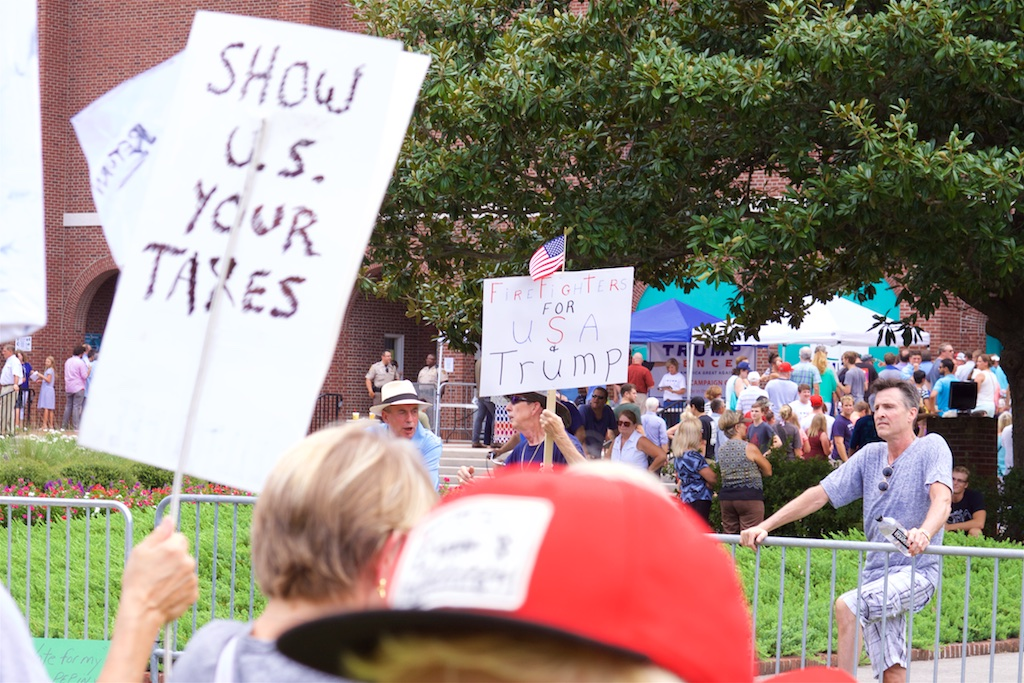
A protester holding a sign toward Trump supporters asking for Trump to publicly release his tax returns, at an August 9, 2016, campaign event in Wilmington, North Carolina

Trump did not release his personal income tax returns, as nominees traditionally do, and said he does not plan to do so before the November election. Before declaring for president he said he would "absolutely" release them if he decided to run for office. Early in the 2016 primary process he promised to put out "very big, very beautiful" returns. He offered various reasons for not giving out the information. He says his lawyers told him not to release the returns because they are being audited. He contends that voters are not interested and "there's nothing to learn from them". He told one interviewer that his tax rate is "none of your business". There is no requirement that presidential candidates release their tax returns but candidates are legally free to do so even when under audit. Tax lawyers differ as to whether releasing tax returns is legally advisable for someone like Trump who is under audit. According to NPR, tax experts such as New York University Law School professor Daniel Shaviro say that "Trump's lawyers may advise him not to release the returns for legal strategy purposes."

=== Use of Twitter ===
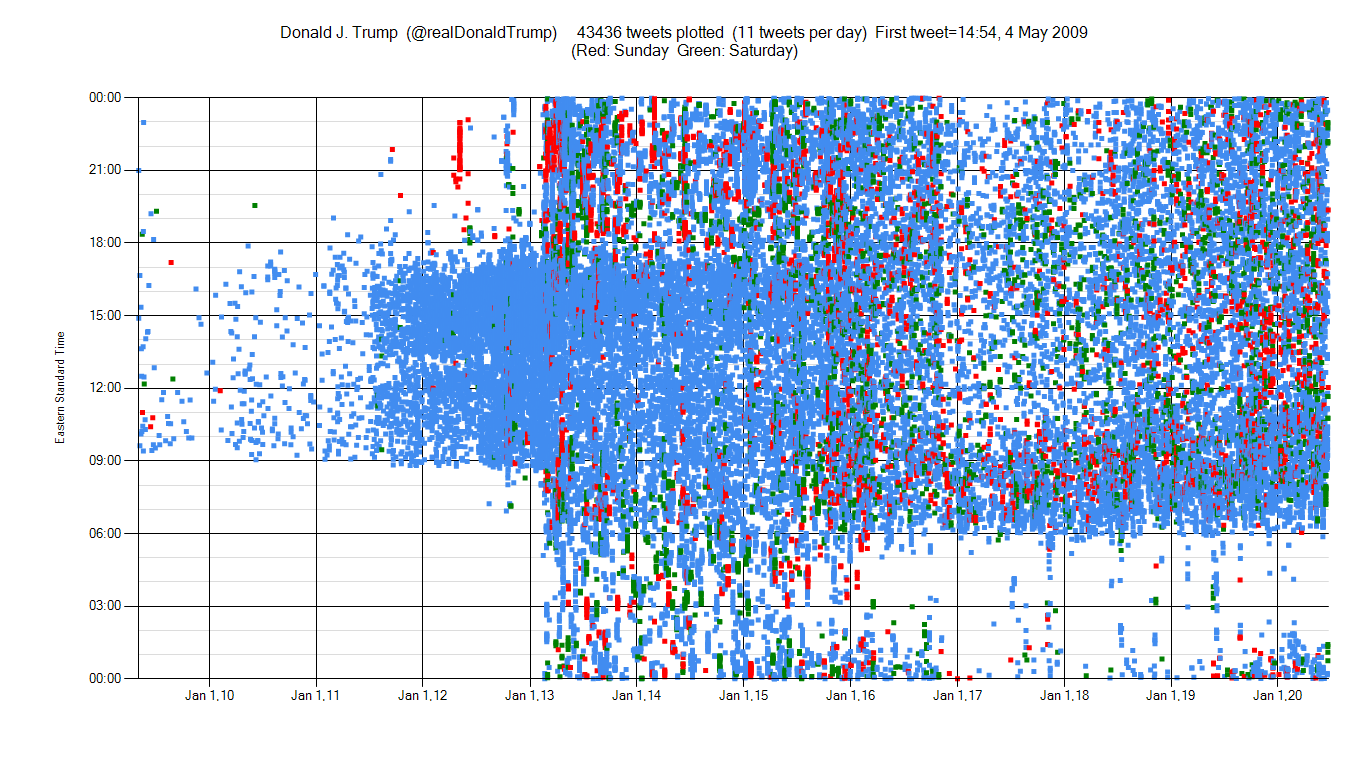
Donald Trump's tweet activity from his first tweet in May 2009. His tweet activity pattern has changed from 2013.

Donald Trump's prolific use of Twitter, which he started using in March 2009, earned him millions of followers. His almost daily use of social media as a vehicle for connecting to his audience is unprecedented as a campaign tool. On November 22, 2015, Trump retweeted an image containing racially charged and inaccurate crime data between blacks and whites, cited to a non-existent group. According to Newsweek, the image appeared to originate with a neo-Nazi Twitter account. When later asked by Bill O'Reilly about his sharing of the image, Trump confirmed that he had personally retweeted the image and said that it came from "sources that are very credible." FactCheck.org reported that the image was a "bogus graphic."

On February 28, Trump re-tweeted a Mussolini quote that had been posted from a parody bot created by Gawker: "It is better to live one day as a lion than 100 years as a sheep". When informed that the source of the quote was Italian fascist dictator Benito Mussolini, Trump responded that the origin of the quote made no difference because "it's a very good quote."

On July 2, 2016, Trump tweeted a picture originally created as a meme by white supremacists. The tweet featured a photo of Clinton next to a star-shaped badge saying "Most Corrupt Candidate Ever!" with a background of $100 bills. The six-pointed star was interpreted as a Star of David and the tweet denounced as "blatantly anti-semitic" by many observers, ranging from the Hillary Clinton campaign to the Anti-Defamation League to House Speaker Paul Ryan. However, Trump's former campaign director Corey Lewandowski dismissed the attacks as "political correctness run amok" and compared the star to a sheriff's badge. The Trump campaign took down the image, then re-uploaded it with a circle replacing the star. However, the re-uploading of the image included the hashtag "#AmericaFirst", and so was criticized by many pundits as evoking the name of the America First Committee, the name of a fascist organization in the United States that urged appeasement with Adolf Hitler and Nazi Germany in the Second World War.

=== Opposition from Republicans ===
An open letter from 120 conservative foreign-policy and national-security leaders, released in March 2016, condemned Trump as "fundamentally dishonest" and unfit to be president. Signatories to the letter included a number of former high-level George W. Bush administration figures, and others, including Eliot A. Cohen, Max Boot, and Daniel W. Drezner. Critics noted that the signers of the letter are "the exact type of establishment Republicans against whom Trump has been railing."

Also in March 2016, another group of foreign policy experts published a letter in Foreign Policy magazine, entitled "Defending the Honor of the U.S. Military from Donald Trump", against Trump's statements that he would direct the military to torture suspected terrorists and their families and target the families of terrorists and other civilians, stating that "every reputable legal expert we know has deemed [these activities] illegal." The letter was signed by both neoconservatives and prominent realists, such as Andrew J. Bacevich and Richard K. Betts.

Several incumbent Republican members of Congress announced they would not vote for Trump. South Carolina Senator Lindsey Graham says he will not vote for either Trump or Clinton in the fall and urged other Republicans to "un-endorse" Trump. Illinois Senator Mark Kirk said he plans to write in a name, possibly David Petraeus or Colin Powell. New York Rep. Richard Hanna, who is retiring at the end of this term, was the first Republican to say he will vote for Hillary Clinton. Illinois Rep. Adam Kinzinger said Trump "for me is beginning to cross a lot of red lines in the unforgivable on politics" and he will vote for a write-in candidate or not vote. Pennsylvania Rep. Charlie Dent said Trump crossed "a bridge too far"; he plans to vote for a write-in candidate. Virginia Rep. Scott Rigell, also retiring at the end of this term, said he will vote for Libertarian candidate Gary Johnson.

A letter from 50 Republican national security officials was published on August 8. The senior officials, who included former White House officials and Cabinet secretaries, said Trump "lacks the character, values, and experience" to be president. Trump responded the same day, saying "The names on this letter are the ones the American people should look to for answers on why the world is a mess, and we thank them for coming forward so everyone in this country knows who deserves the blame for making the world such a dangerous place."

=== Trump University ===
Trump University, and Trump himself, were involved during the campaign in three ongoing lawsuits alleging fraudulent business practices. One of the suits was scheduled to be heard in San Diego in November, three weeks after the general election. In late July, the judge hearing that case denied a motion to dismiss it. Shortly after Trump won the presidency, the parties agreed to a settlement of all three pending cases. In the settlement, Trump did not admit to any wrongdoing but agreed to pay a total of $25 million.

The lawsuits were active throughout the campaign and were invoked by Trump's rivals in Republican primary debates. Hillary Clinton used the Trump University allegations against Trump in speeches and campaign ads. Trump repeatedly criticized Gonzalo P. Curiel, the presiding judge in two of the cases, stating that his Mexican heritage serves as a conflict of interest. During a June 3, 2016, interview with Jake Tapper of CNN, Tapper asked Trump what Curiel's rulings have to do with his heritage. Trump answered, "I've been treated very unfairly by this judge. Now, this judge is of Mexican heritage. I'm building a wall, OK? I'm building a wall." Trump also suggested that Curiel is a friend of a lawyer for one of the plaintiffs, to which the lawyer responded that they had not been friends in any "social" setting.

Legal experts criticized Trump's comments, and Paul Ryan, who had endorsed Trump for president, disavowed the comments, saying that they were racist. Meanwhile, Governor Chris Christie defended Trump's comments, saying that Trump was not a "pre-programmed robotic politician".

Trump also accused Curiel of bias because of his membership in La Raza Lawyers of California, a professional association of Hispanic attorneys. Former United States Attorney General Alberto Gonzales wrote on June 4 that some of Trump's aides alleged a link between the La Raza Lawyers of California and an advocacy organization called the National Council of La Raza, which had organized protests at Trump rallies: "The two groups are unaffiliated, and Curiel is not a member of NCLR. But Trump may be concerned that the lawyers' association or its members represent or support the other advocacy organization".

On June 7, 2016, Trump said that his criticism of the judge had been "misconstrued" and that his concerns about Curiel's impartiality were not based on ethnicity alone, but rather on rulings in the case. He said that he was not categorically attacking people of Mexican heritage.

In 2013 Florida Attorney General Pam Bondi requested a political donation from Trump while her office was "currently reviewing the allegations" in a New York class action suit. The Donald J. Trump Foundation sent her re-election campaign $25,000. Bondi's office decided not to pursue action. The Washington Post reported in September 2016 that foundation was fined $2,500 (~$3,354 in 2025) by the IRS for using the funds to make a political contribution to Bondi's PAC.

=== 2005 Access Hollywood video tape ===
Video and accompanying audio were released by The Washington Post on October 7, 2016, in which Trump referred obscenely to women in a 2005 conversation with Billy Bush while they were preparing to film an episode of Access Hollywood. Trump said that he could grab women "by the pussy" and get away with it, because he is a "star". The audio was met with a reaction of disbelief and disgust from the media. Following the revelation, Trump's campaign issued an apology, stating that the video was of a private conversation from "many years ago".

External videos
- Trump recorded having extremely lewd conversation about women in 2005, The Washington Post, 12:44, October 8, 2016
- Donald Trump apologizes for sexist comments about groping women, Trump campaign video via PBS Newshour, 1:15, October 7, 2016

The incident was condemned by numerous prominent Republicans. RNC Chairman Reince Priebus said "No woman should ever be described in these terms or talked about in this manner. Ever." Mitt Romney tweeted "Hitting on married women? Condoning assault? Such vile degradations demean our wives and daughters and corrupt America's face to the world." John Kasich called the remarks "indefensible." Jeb Bush called them "reprehensible." Speaker of the House Paul Ryan disinvited Trump to participate in a campaign event for Ryan in Wisconsin, saying that he was "sickened" by Trump's comments. Three days later Ryan indicated that he would no longer defend or support Trump's presidential campaign, and in a highly unusual move he freed down-ticket congressional members to use their own judgement, saying "you all need to do what's best for you and your district." Trump's wife Melania called Trump's words "offensive" and "inappropriate." By October 8 several dozen Republicans had called for Trump to withdraw from the campaign and let Pence head the ticket. Trump insisted he would never drop out.

Several hours after the initial report by The Washington Post, the Trump campaign released a video statement in which Trump stated that "Anyone who knows me knows these words don't reflect who I am. I said it, I was wrong, and I apologize." Towards the end of the statement Trump also said that "there is a big difference between the words and actions", and then went on to say that "Bill Clinton has actually abused women and Hillary has bullied, attacked, shamed, and intimidated his victims". This apology was criticized severely by the media and members of the public as being insincere and attempting to divert the problem at hand with unsubstantiated accusations against his political opponents. Trump replied that "thousands and thousands" of supporters sent him letters after the controversial video was published.

=== Sexual misconduct accusations ===
Following the October 7, 2016, revelation of Trump's 2005 remarks during a filming of an Access Hollywood episode and his denial that he had ever actually engaged in the behaviors he described, multiple women came forward with new stories of sexual misconduct, including unwanted kissing and groping. Sources for the stories included The New York Times and People magazine. The stories received widespread national media coverage. Also, previous allegations and statements from other women resurfaced. In 1997, Jill Harth filed a lawsuit alleging Trump groped her in "intimate" parts and engaged in "relentless" sexual harassment. Trump and his campaign denied all of these charges, and Trump claimed to have begun drafting a lawsuit against The New York Times alleging libel. On October 13, Trump denied all of the allegations, referring to them as "false smears" and alleging "a conspiracy against ... the American people".

Trump, who owned the Miss Universe franchise, was also accused to have walked into dressing rooms of contestants while they were in varying stages of undress without prior notice of his arrival. Trump said in an interview with Howard Stern in 2005, "no men are anywhere. And I'm allowed to go in because I'm the owner of the pageant. And therefore I'm inspecting it ... Is everyone OK? You know, they're standing there with no clothes. And you see these incredible-looking women. And so I sort of get away with things like that. [...] I'll go backstage before a show, and everyone's getting dressed and ready and everything else."

=== Uncertainty over accepting the election results ===
Trump at a campaign rally on October 20, 2016, stating that, "I will totally accept the results of this great and historic presidential election, if I win."

Trump repeatedly and falsely insinuated that the election was "rigged" against him, and he sowed doubt about the election certification process. Campaigning in Colorado, Trump falsely claimed that the Democratic Party "[rigged] the election at polling booths".

During the 2016 Republican primaries, after Trump lost to Ted Cruz in the Iowa Republican caucus, Trump claimed that Cruz perpetrated "fraud" and "stole" the Iowa caucuses, because Cruz's campaign spread a false rumor "minutes before the [caucuses] began" that fellow candidate Ben Carson had dropped out of the race. In the final debate against Hillary Clinton, Trump cast doubt on whether he would accept the results of the election should he lose, saying, "I'll keep you in suspense". His comment touched off a media and political uproar in which he was accused of "threatening to upend a fundamental pillar of American democracy" and "rais[ing] the prospect that millions of his supporters may not accept the results on November 8 if he loses". Rick Hasen described Trump's comments as "appalling and unprecedented" and feared there could be "violence in the streets from his supporters if Trump loses". The next day Trump said, "Of course, I would accept a clear election result, but I would also reserve my right to contest or file a legal challenge in the case of a questionable result". He also stated that he would "totally" accept the election results "if I win".

Trump eventually won the election but lost the popular vote. He went on to claim, without evidence, that he had won the popular vote "if you deduct the millions of people who voted illegally", asserting after taking office that around four million illegal immigrants had voted for Clinton.

=== Allegations of promoting voter intimidation ===
In the weeks before the election, Trump urged his supporters to volunteer as poll watchers on Election Day, saying they were needed to guard against "voter fraud" and a "rigged" outcome. The rhetoric was seen as a call to intimidate minority voters or challenge their credentials to prevent them from voting.

Democratic Party officials sued Trump in Arizona, Nevada, Ohio and Pennsylvania, accusing him of voter intimidation, in violation of the 1965 Voters Rights Act and the 1871 Ku Klux Klan Act, with his calls for supporters to monitor polling stations in minority neighborhoods. The Ohio Democratic Party wrote in a legal filing, "Trump has sought to advance his campaign's goal of 'voter suppression' by using the loudest microphone in the nation to implore his supporters to engage in unlawful intimidation," Other lawsuits used similar language. A separate lawsuit in New Jersey accuses the Republican National Committee of cooperating with Trump's "ballot security" activities, which the RNC is prohibited from doing by a 1982 consent decree.

A federal District Court judge in Nevada ordered Trump campaigners to make available any training materials they provided for "poll watchers, poll observers, exit pollsters or any other similarly tasked individuals." A District Court judge in Pennsylvania denied a request by the state Republican Party to allow poll watching by people from outside the immediate area, which is forbidden by the state election code.

== Reactions ==
=== Domestic reactions ===
President Barack Obama congratulated Trump on winning the election and stated that although he and Trump had differences of opinion, it is his goal to ensure a smooth transition for the incoming president. Trump also received congratulations from Republican primary rivals including Florida Governor Jeb Bush, Texas Senator Ted Cruz, and Ohio Governor John Kasich. Mitt Romney, Bill Clinton, Hillary Clinton, George H. W. Bush and George W. Bush also congratulated him.

=== World leaders ===
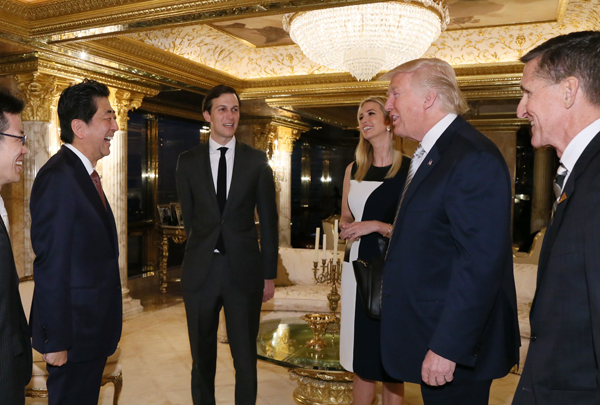
Shinzō Abe, Prime Minister of Japan, held informal talks with the President-elect on November 17, 2016.

Mexican President Enrique Peña Nieto offered his congratulations and stated that Mexico will continue to have positive working relationships with the United States. Leaders of the United Kingdom, Canada, Italy, Rwanda, Israel, Palestine, and other countries voiced similar messages.

Chinese President Xi Jinping stated to Trump that he placed "great importance on the China-U.S. relationship, and look[s] forward to working with you to uphold the principles of non-conflict, non-confrontation, mutual respect, and win-win cooperation." Japanese Prime Minister Shinzō Abe said "The stability of the Asia-Pacific region, which is a driving force of the global economy, brings peace and prosperity to the United States. Japan and the United States are unwavering allies tied firmly with the bond of universal values such as freedom, democracy, basic human rights and the rule of law."

The strategic partnership between the European Union and the United States is rooted in our shared values of freedom, human rights, democracy and a belief in the market economy ... Today, it is more important than ever to strengthen transatlantic relations ... when dealing with unprecedented challenges such as Da'esh, the threats to Ukraine's sovereignty and territorial integrity, climate change and migration ... We should spare no effort to ensure that the ties that bind us remain strong and durable.

— Donald Tusk, President of the European Council

German Chancellor Angela Merkel expressed that it was "difficult to bear" some of the confrontations during the Trump campaign. She expressed her interest in working with President-elect on shared values, such as respect for individuals irrespective of their religion, gender, or heritage. Merkel stated that the relationship with the U.S. is "a foundation stone of German foreign policy." French President François Hollande said that his country would need to be strong in the face of an upcoming "period of uncertainty ... What is at stake is peace, the fight against terrorism, the Middle East and the preservation of the planet."

Russian President Vladimir Putin "expressed confidence that the dialogue between Moscow and Washington, in keeping with each other's views, meets the interests of both Russia and the U.S." After stating that the relationships between the United States and Russia had degenerated over time, he declared that "Russia is ready and wants to restore the fully fledged relations with the U.S." Putin said that the engagement should be "based on principles of equality, mutual respect and a real accounting each other's positions."

Turkish President Recep Tayyip Erdoğan said that he hoped that the Trump presidency would be a "beneficial" step towards worldwide democracy, liberty, and fundamental rights.

=== Foreign politicians ===
German Justice Minister Heiko Maas tweeted: "The world won't end, but things will get more crazy". Germany's Defence Minister, Ursula von der Leyen, wanted to know if the U.S. would maintain its NATO commitments, since Trump had suggested during his campaign that the U.S. should consider NATO allies' level of military commitment before coming to their aid. Jens Stoltenberg, Secretary General of NATO, offered his congratulations and welcomed Trump to the NATO Summit in 2017 to discuss how to respond to the "challenging new security environment, including hybrid warfare, cyberattacks, the threat of terrorism."

Marine Le Pen, leader of the far-right Front National party, sent her congratulations and exclaimed, peuple américain, libre! (French for 'free American people!') Nigel Farage, the outgoing leader of the UK Independence Party and Brexiter, said he was handing his "mantle" over to Trump. Trump was supported by other right-wing and far-right leaders including in Austria, Germany, Serbia, the Czech Republic, Belgium, the Netherlands, and Italy.

=== Protests ===
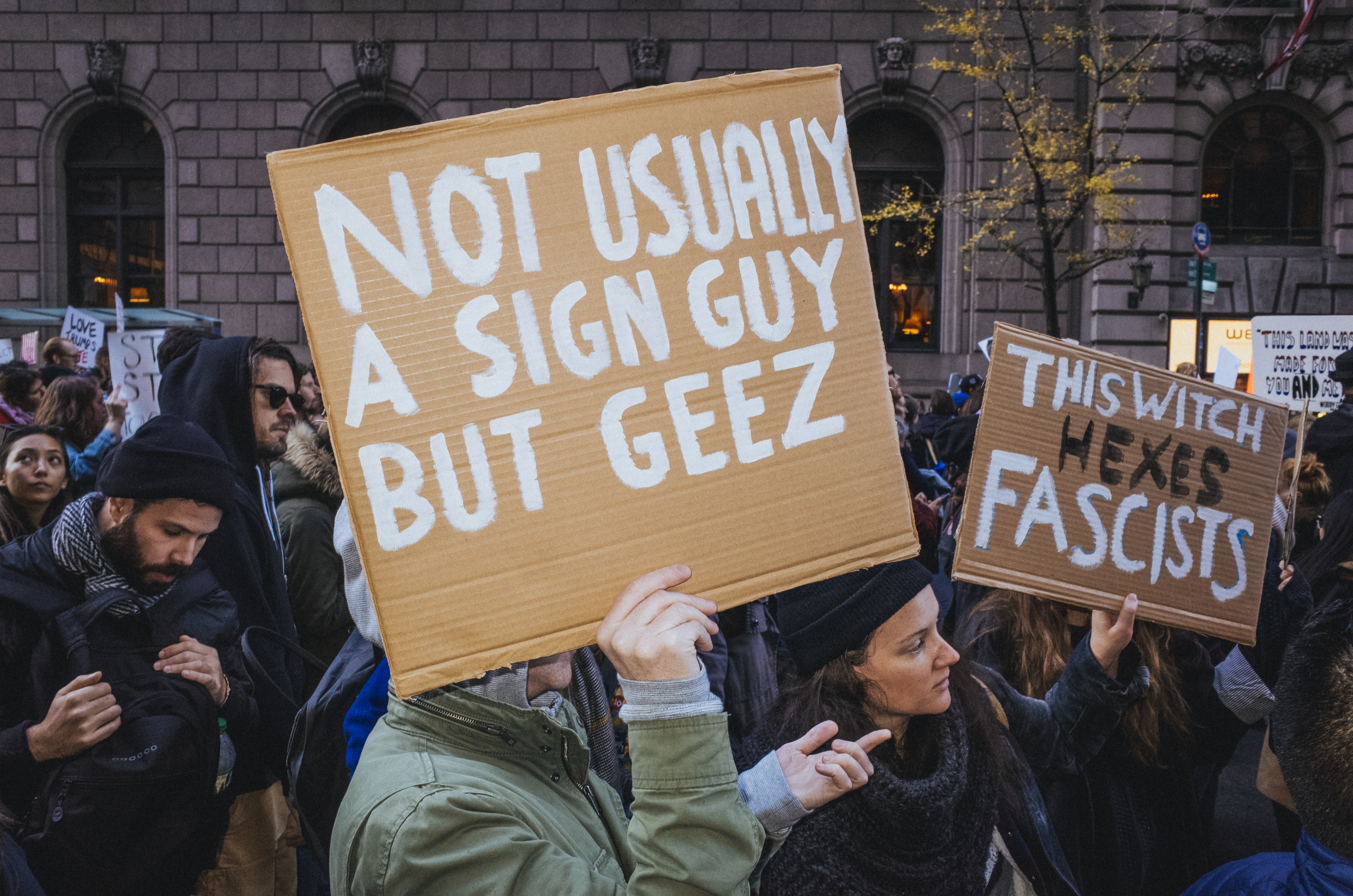
A protest sign in New York City

After the 2016 election, protests against Trump were held in many cities across the United States. Trump said that some of the protesters were "professional protesters" who were protesting him because they did not know him. Rudy Giuliani, the former mayor of New York City, called the protesters "spoiled crybabies".
