= Donald Trump 2016 presidential campaign launch speech =

Donald Trump's 2016 presidential campaign launch speech
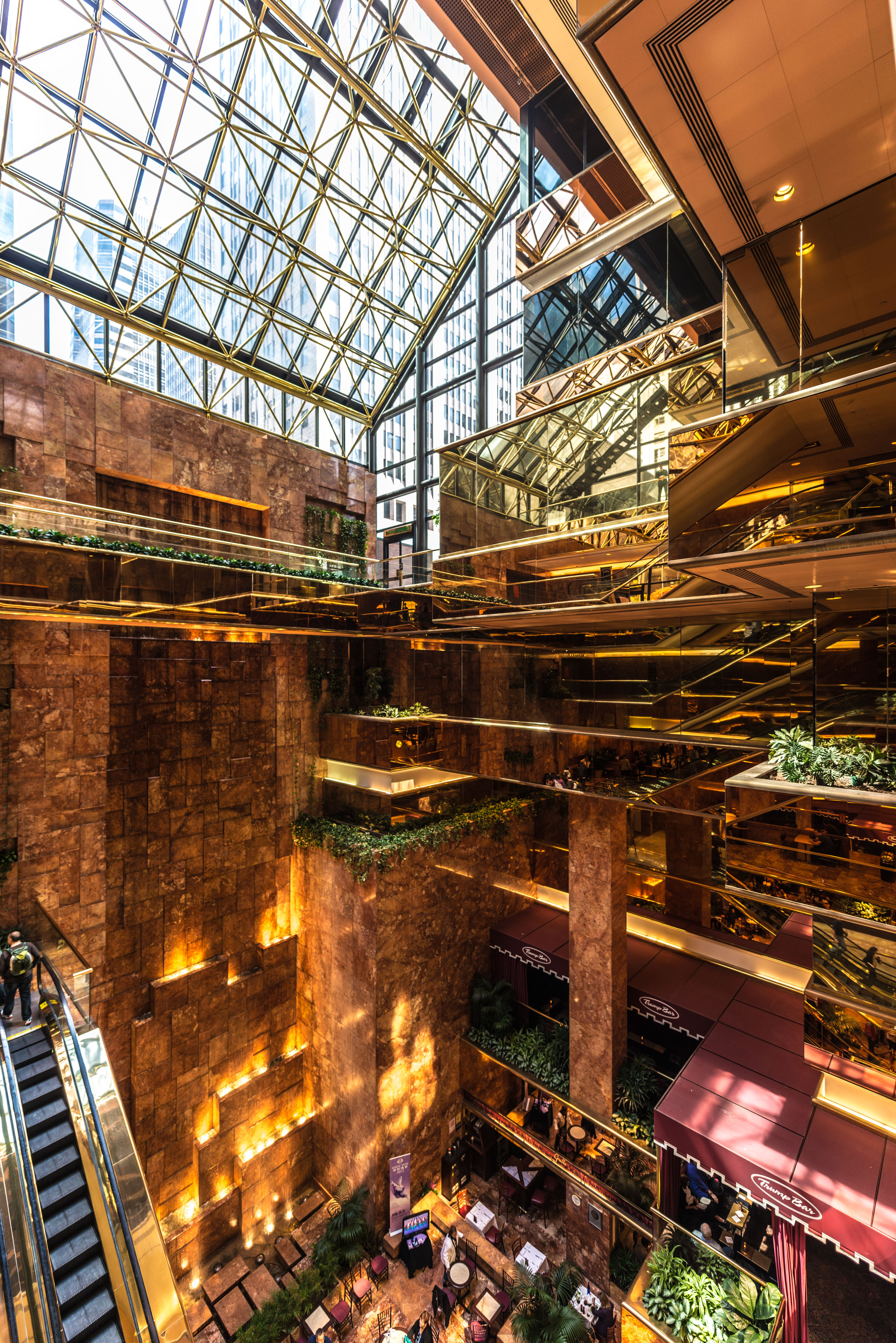
- Atrium of the Trump Tower, where the announcement took place
- Date: June 16, 2015; 11 years ago
- Location: Trump Tower
- Cause: Announcing candidacy for president of the United States
- Filmed by: C-SPAN
- Outcome: Won the 2016 United States Presidential election
- Footage: Full speech

On June 16, 2015, businessman Donald Trump gave a speech that launched his 2016 presidential campaign. The speech received both acclaim and criticism, and the campaign ultimately culminated in his victory in the 2016 United States presidential election.

At the time, very few thought that Trump was a viable challenger for the presidency. He had been speculated to enter the campaign, but his chances of winning were generally dismissed.

The speech went viral for Trump's false portrayal of illegal immigrants from Mexico and other countries:

The U.S. has become a dumping ground for everybody else’s problems. . . . When Mexico sends its people, they’re not sending their best. . . . They’re sending people that have lots of problems, and they’re bringing those problems with us. They’re bringing drugs. They’re bringing crime. They’re rapists. And some, I assume, are good people. But I speak to border guards and they tell us what we’re getting. And it only makes common sense. It only makes common sense. They’re sending us not the right people.

Trump's false portrayal, widely perceived as racist, led to much media coverage from people opposed to the characterization. The quantity of free media thus acquired far outweighed the attention paid to his primary opponents, and within weeks he led polls for the 2016 Republican Party presidential primaries, a lead he would never relinquish.

== Contents of the speech ==
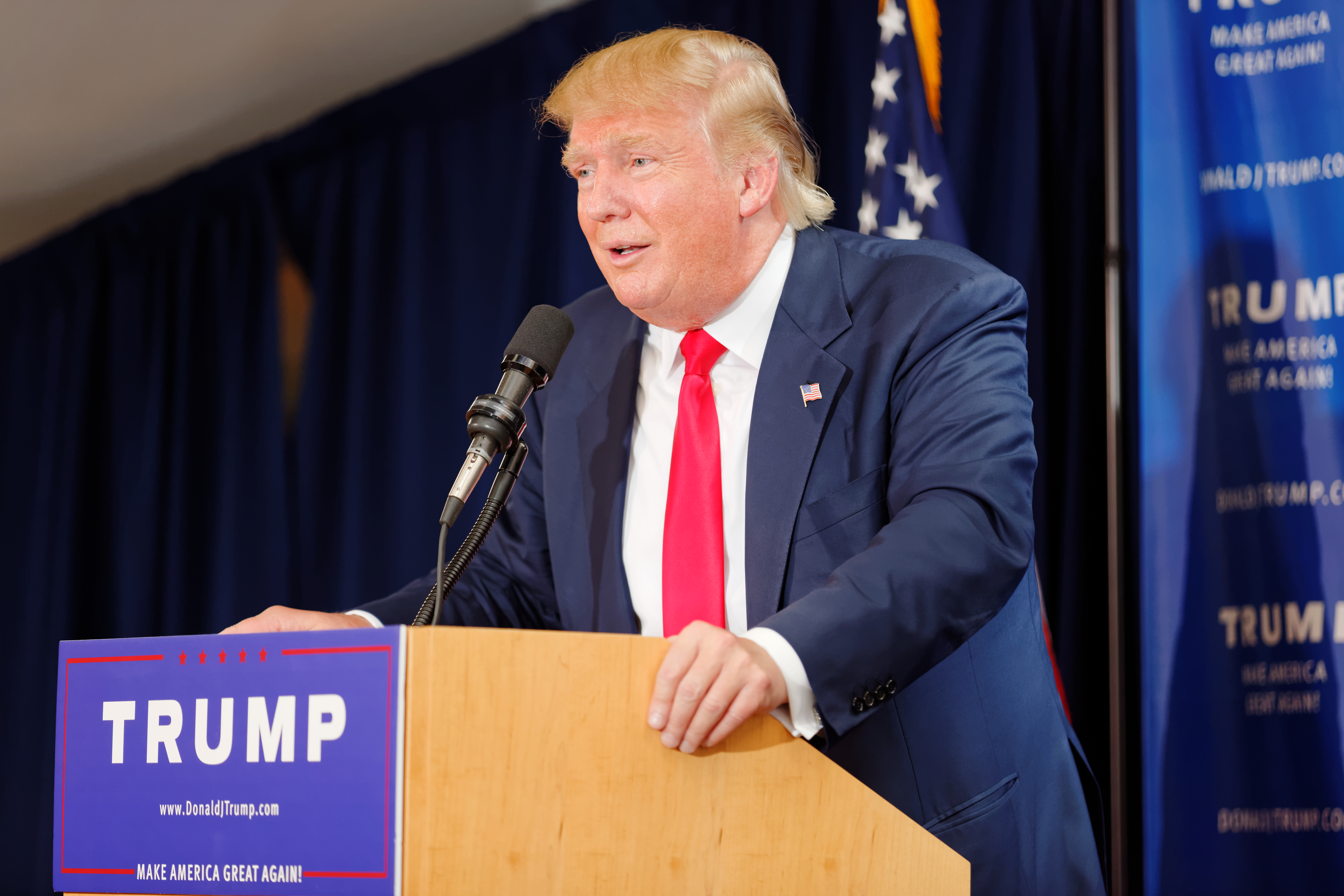
Trump at a campaign event later that day in New Hampshire

Trump formally announced his candidacy on June 16, 2015, with a campaign rally and speech at the Trump Tower in New York City. In the moments before the announcement, he came down a golden escalator at Trump Tower, which has since become a metonym for the announcement. In his speech, he drew attention to domestic issues, such as illegal immigration, offshoring of American jobs, the U.S. national debt, and Islamic terrorism. His campaign slogan was announced as "Make America Great Again". He declared that he would self-fund his presidential campaign and would refuse any money from donors and lobbyists. The British gambling company Ladbrokes offered 150/1 odds of him winning the presidency. The campaign hired a casting company to supply paid actors to attend the event.

Following the announcement, most attention focused on Trump's comments on illegal immigration: "When Mexico sends its people, they're not sending their best ... They're sending people that have lots of problems, and they're bringing those problems with [them]. They're bringing drugs. They're bringing crime. They're rapists. And some, I assume, are good people." The comments were interpreted and reported in various ways. The statement was controversial and led several businesses and organizations, including NBC, Macy's, Univision, and NASCAR, to cut ties with him. Reactions from other presidential candidates were mixed, with some Republican candidates disagreeing with the tone of the remarks but supporting the idea that illegal immigration was an important campaign issue, while other Republican candidates as well as the leading Democratic candidates condemned the remarks and policy stances as offensive or inflammatory.

Trump stood by his comments despite public backlash, saying he intended them to be aimed solely at the government of Mexico for sending criminals over the border into the United States and that he did not intend his comments to refer to immigrants themselves. Fact checkers found no evidence that the government of Mexico was sending anyone, criminal or otherwise, across the border.

=== War in Iraq ===
After spending some time speaking about trade and illegal immigration, Trump launched into criticism of the 2003–11 Iraq war.

[ISIS] took the oil that, when we left Iraq, I said we should’ve taken. So now ISIS has the oil, and what they don’t have, Iran has. And in 19—and I will tell you this, and I said it very strongly, years ago, I said—and I love the military, and I want to have the strongest military that we’ve ever had, and we need it more now than ever. But I said, “don’t hit Iraq,” because you’re going to totally destabilize the Middle East. Iran is going to take over the Middle East, Iran and somebody else will get the oil, and it turned out that Iran is now taking over Iraq. Think of it. Iran is taking over Iraq, and they’re taking it over big league. We spent $2 trillion in Iraq, $2 trillion. We lost thousands of lives, thousands in Iraq. We have wounded soldiers, who I love, I love—they’re great—all over the place, thousands and thousands of wounded soldiers. And we have nothing. We can’t even go there. We have nothing.

Attacking the Iraq war would become a critical way for Trump to differentiate himself from his Republican competitors. While he offered support to the Iraq war prior to its launch in spring 2003 and for several months afterwards, he was criticizing the handling of the war by 2004, a sharp contrast with other Republican candidates still supporting the invasion even in 2015. During the campaign, Trump repeatedly and falsely denied ever having supported the war, setting a contrast with his eventual opponent in the general election Hillary Clinton, who could not deny having cast a vote in the United States Senate supporting the war.

=== Contrasting himself with Obama ===
Our country needs a truly great leader, and we need a truly great leader now. We need a leader that wrote The Art of the Deal. We need a leader that can bring back our jobs, can bring back our manufacturing, can bring back our military, can take care of our vets. Our vets have been abandoned. And we also need a cheerleader. You know, when President Obama was elected, I said, “Well, the one thing, I think he’ll do well. I think he’ll be a great cheerleader for the country. I think he’d be a great spirit.” He was vibrant. He was young. I really thought that he would be a great cheerleader. He’s not a leader. That’s true. You’re right about that. But he wasn’t a cheerleader. He’s actually a negative force. He’s been a negative force. He wasn’t a cheerleader; he was the opposite. We need somebody that can take the brand of the United States and make it great again. It’s not great again.

Presaging his eventual campaign slogan, Trump promised to Make America Great Again, contrasting himself with the current president, Barack Obama, whom Trump had criticized extremely harshly at times prior to (and later during) the latter's campaign in 2015-2016. Although Obama was not running in the 2016 election and was at the time still relatively popular, Trump compared what he considered the disappointing failure of Obama's "Hope" message and presented himself as an alternative who would actually bring about hope.

== Paid audience members ==
One week after Trump's announcement, The Hollywood Reporter revealed that at least some of the audience were paid actors, pointing to an email sent by New York political consulting group Gotham Government Relations and Communications offering $50 for background actors to attend the event. The email stated that "we are looking to cast people for the event to wear t-shirts and carry signs and help cheer him in support of his announcement. We understand this is not a traditional 'background job,' but we believe acting comes in all forms and this is inclusive of that school of thought."

Trump's then-campaign manager Corey Lewandowski initially denied the allegation, but in 2021 confirmed that audience members were paid $50 per person to attend. Trump's lawyer Michael Cohen admitted to hiring Gotham Government Relations but denied paying for audience attendees. David Schwartz, a partner at Gotham Government Relations, said "the reality is we hired 50 people, some of whom were part-time actors I found out later on."
