= PESO model =

Marketing communications industry framework

The PESO Model is a strategic framework used in marketing and public relations to categorize media into four types: paid, earned, shared, and owned. The model describes the use of different media channels in organizations' marketing approach, and has been widely adopted in the marketing communications industry.

The PESO Model consists of four components:

- Paid Media: Content that is paid, including social media advertising, sponsored content, and email marketing.
- Earned Media: Content related to a person or organization that is published by a third party without any form of payment to the publisher.
- Shared Media: Content that is shared on social media platforms, fostering engagement and interaction.
- Owned Media: Content and channels that a company controls, such as websites, blogs, and branded social media accounts.
