= Michael Glassner =

American political advisor

Personal details
- Born: July 30, 1963 (age 63)
- Party: Republican
- Education: University of Kansas (BA)

Michael Glassner (born July 30, 1963) is an American political advisor and commentator who is the president of the public affairs consulting firm C&M Transcontinental. He was COO of the Donald Trump 2020 presidential campaign.

== Early life and education ==
Glassner moved to Kansas in 1972 at the age of eight, where he was raised on a farm outside Peabody, Kansas. Glassner graduated from the University of Kansas in 1985 with a bachelor's degree in Political Science.

== Career ==
In 1988, Glassner was Bob Dole's traveling aide during Dole's presidential campaign. He held senior roles in Dole’s 1996 presidential campaign, Leadership PAC, and Senate offices in Kansas.

In 1998, Glassner began working for the Port Authority of New York & New Jersey, where he became the senior advisor and eventual Chief of Staff to then-Chairman Lewis Eisenberg. In 2001, he became Senior Vice President for External Affairs for IDT Corporation, where he oversaw government relations, communications, and investor relations.

Glassner w as an advisor to the George W. Bush 2000 presidential campaign, and later as director of vice-presidential operations for the John McCain 2008 presidential campaign. In 2014, Glassner was southwest regional political director of AIPAC.

In 2015, Glassner was hired by the Trump campaign as political director and was later named deputy campaign manager. In January 2017, President-elect Donald Trump named Glassner as COO of the Donald Trump 2020 presidential campaign.

On December 15, 2020, Trump appointed Glassner to the United States Holocaust Memorial Council. Glassner has also been a member of the board of directors for the American Red Cross of Northern New Jersey and the board of advisors for the Rutgers Business School – Newark and New Brunswick.
