= Earned media =

Content relating to a person or organization

Earned media (or free media) is content relating to a person or organization, which is published by a third party without any form of payment to the publisher. It includes articles by media outlets, interviews with the person or representatives of the organization, or bylined editorials in trade press and other publications. The phrase "earned media" serves as a contrast to the concept of "paid media". It may also include social media sharing, unpaid mentions by podcast hosts and guests, or word-of-mouth marketing.

Earned media excludes advertising and advertorials (paid media) and company branding (owned media).

== Background ==
Marketing communication can be summarized as falling into four categories, (paid, earned, social [or shared], and owned) media. This categorization is sometimes referred to as the PESO model.

- Paid media is a traditional approach to promotion, and usually takes the form of advertising or advertorials (paid opinion pieces). Paid media also includes marketing activities like sponsored posts and paying to have links posted in a Chumbox.
- Earned media is not paid for, but is published voluntarily by third parties (e.g., an article in a daily newspaper). This includes traditional publicity activities such as media relations or publicity (e.g., sending press releases to newspapers and magazines, in hopes that they will voluntarily publish an independent article about the organization or product) and investor relations (e.g., providing information of interest to investors or a business journal).
- Social, or shared, media refers to customers and other members of the public sharing content on social media platforms (e.g., someone recommending a product to a friend on Facebook), as well as social media content produced by the company.
- Owned media is produced by the company itself on channels it directly controls (e.g., the corporate website, corporate social media accounts). Owned media is self-published.

Sometimes, the categories overlap. For example, paying a social media influencer to promote a product or event is both "social" and "paid" media. If a company is criticized online, and the controversy is described in a news article, that could be both "shared" and "earned" media.

== Description ==
Earned media is what happens when a person or organization is spoken of by a third party, with no payment changing hands. Examples include mentions in traditional media, guest appearances on television shows, or an opinion piece in a periodical. Sometimes social media mentions, ratings, reviews, and online discussions are included in this category.

Although earned media is not paid for, it is not entirely cost-free. Generating earned media may require hiring staff, creating content, promoting the brand through paid media, or creating programs (e.g., a contest) that will result earned media. If an advertisement or other paid marketing effort goes viral, so that other people and media outlets publish about it without payment, then the additional exposure (but not the original paid media) is earned media.

While marketers can help generate earned media activity, they do not generate it directly. It is earned "through relationships, incredibly newsworthy stories, and targeted messaging", without paying the media outlet. One inherent limitation, compared to paid or owned media, is that the person or organization has to convince journalists, editors, and television news producers to write a story about them, or an editor to publish an outside editorial. While this gatekeeper function serves to filter out lower quality and non-newsworthy content, it may also allow media outlets to act as censors when they do not agree with the source or its message.

Further, because the person or organization does not control the message once it is in the hands of a journalist, the message may not be what they wanted, and may be negative. As one example, while the 2016 Trump political campaign was cited as having obtained billions of dollars in earned media, one study estimated that 23% of earned media mentions were negative.

== Reputation ==
Earned media is trusted more by consumers than other forms of promotion.

A Nielsen study in 2013 found that earned media (also described in the report as word-of-mouth) is the most trusted source of information in all countries it surveyed worldwide, and is the channel most likely to stimulate the consumer to action. In a 2019 study by the Institute for Public Relations, participants shown an earned news story, an advertisement, a blog post, and a company blog post found the earned media story the most credible. Readers sought out and paid attention to information such as the independence and credentials of the journalist, the balance of the coverage, and the prestige of the outlet in which the story appeared. Consumers are more likely to trust a voluntary recommendation from someone they know more than a paid advertisement.

== Metrics ==
Compared to advertising metrics, the value that earned media contributes to the organization's profitability and purpose is harder to determine. However, various ways of estimating an advertising equivalency have been proposed by the Public Relations Society of America. Sometimes simpler methods, such as the number of followers on a journalist's social media page, have been used.
