= List of real estate investment firms =

Below is a list of notable real estate investment firms.

== Largest investment managers by real estate assets under management ==
Institutional Real Estate, Inc.'s annual IRE.IQ Real Estate Managers Guide lists real estate investment managers by their real estate assets under management (AUM). In 2025, the listed real estate managers have more than $5.1 trillion in real estate AUM, with the top 10 largest firms holding $2.2 trillion in real estate AUM and the top 50 firms holding $4.4 trillion in real estate AUM.

Top 10 real estate managers by gross value of real estate AUM ($m) as of 31 December 2024
Real estate manager	Total	North America (U.S. & Canada)	Europe, Middle East & Africa	Asia Pacific	Latin America
Blackstone	602,000.00	N/A	N/A	N/A	N/A
Brookfield Asset Management	277,333.00	178,602.00	58,466.00	34,158.00	6,1707.00
Prologis	197,559.00	149,157.00	31,412.00	12,841.00	4,149.00
MetLife Investment Management	196,294.51	183,615.72	2,920.02	5,550.12	4,208.63
PIMCO	174,000.00	39,000.00	59,000.00	12,300.00	0.00
PGIM Real Estate	158,982.20	129,932.15	13,771.74	8,808.67	2,315.97
UBS Asset Management	157,172.52	36,737,67	113,269.81	7,165.03	0.00
CBRE Investment Management	146,250.00	60,204.00	65,098.00	20,930.00	18.00
ESR	141,700.00	0.00	22,600.00	119,100.00	0.00
Nuveen Real Estate	140,757.30	108,560.60	26,569.20	5,627.50	0.00

== Largest private real estate companies by capital raised ==
Each year Private Equity International publishes the PERE 100, a ranking of the largest private equity real estate companies by how much capital they have raised for investment in the last five years.

In the 2024 ranking, Blackstone Inc. retained top spot.

2024 PERE 100 rank	Firm	Headquarters	Five-year fundraising total ($m)
1	Blackstone Inc.	(United States) New York City	63,457
2	Brookfield Asset Management	(Canada) Toronto	39,797
3	TPG Inc.	(United States) Fort Worth, Texas	24,020
4	BGO	(United States) New York City	19,026
5	GLP Capital Partners	Singapore	16,842
6	Cerberus Capital Management	(United States) New York City	15,884
7	Blue Owl Real Estate	(United States) Chicago	15,361
8	Ares Management	(United States) Los Angeles	15,272
9	Hines	(United States) Houston	14,003
10	ESR Group	Hong Kong	13,841

== Notable private real estate investment firms ==
=== Americas ===
- AEW Capital Management
- Angelo Gordon
- Apollo Global Management
- Ares Management
- Bain Capital
- Barings LLC
- Beacon Capital Partners
- BentallGreenOak
- Blackstone Inc.
- Bridge Investment Group
- Brookfield Asset Management
- Cadillac Fairview
- CBRE Investment Management
- Centerbridge Partners
- Cerberus Capital Management
- CIM Group
- Clarion Partners
- Cohen & Steers
- Crow Holdings
- Enterprise Community Partners
- Equity International
- Fortress Investment Group
- GI Partners
- Greystar Real Estate Partners
- GTIS Partners
- Harbert Management Corporation
- Harrison Street Real Estate Capital
- Heitman LLC
- HIG Realty Partners
- Hines
- Invesco Real Estate
- Ivanhoé Cambridge
- Jamestown L.P.
- JRK Property Holdings
- Kennedy Wilson
- KKR
- LaSalle Investment Management
- Lone Star Funds
- MCR Hotels
- MetLife Investment Management
- Morgan Properties
- Nuveen Real Estate
- Oak Street Capital
- Oaktree Capital Management
- Oxford Properties
- PGIM Real Estate
- PIMCO
- PineBridge Benson Elliot
- Pretium Partners
- QuadReal Property Group
- Rithm Capital
- Rockpoint Group
- Sculptor Capital Management
- Southwest Value Partners
- Starlight Investments
- Starwood Capital Group
- StepStone Group
- Stockbridge Capital Group
- The Carlyle Group
- Tishman Speyer
- TPG
- Tricon Residential
- Walton Street Capital
- Warburg Pincus

=== Asia ===
- BPEA EQT
- CapitaLand
- Charter Hall
- DNE Group
- ESR Group
- Gaw Capital
- GLP
- Hony Capital
- IGIS Asset Management
- Keppel Capital
- Lendlease
- PAG
- Phoenix Property Investors
- Queensland Investment Corporation
- Sino-Ocean Capital

=== EMEA ===
- Ardian
- BC Partners
- Bouwfonds
- CapMan
- COIMA
- EQT Exeter
- Europa Capital
- Kildare Partners
- MARK Capital Management
- Partners Group
- Patrizia SE

== Notable real estate investment trusts ==
=== Americas ===
- Aimco
- Alexander's
- Alexandria Real Estate Equities
- American Campus Communities
- American Homes 4 Rent
- American Tower
- Americold
- Annaly Capital Management
- Arlington Asset Investment
- AvalonBay Communities
- Boston Properties
- Brandywine Realty Trust
- Boardwalk Real Estate Investment Trust
- Brookfield Property Partners
- Brixmor Property Group
- Camden Property Trust
- CAPREIT
- CBL Properties
- Cedar Realty Trust
- Chartwell Retirement Residences
- Choice Properties REIT
- Clear Channel Outdoor
- Cominar REIT
- CoreCivic
- Corporate Office Properties Trust
- Cousins Properties
- Crombie REIT
- Crown Castle
- CubeSmart
- Digital Realty
- Dream Industrial REIT
- Dream Office REIT
- EPR Properties
- Equinix
- Equity Residential
- Essex Property Trust
- Extended Stay America
- Extra Space Storage
- Federal Realty Investment Trust
- Fibra Uno
- First Capital REIT
- Gaming and Leisure Properties
- GEO Group
- Granite Real Estate
- H&R REIT
- Healthpeak Properties
- Hersha Hotels and Resorts
- Host Hotels & Resorts
- Hudson Pacific Properties
- InnSuites Hospitality
- InterRent REIT
- InvenTrust Properties
- Invitation Homes
- Iron Mountain
- JBG Smith
- Kimco Realty
- Lamar Advertising Company
- Life Storage
- Lineage
- Macerich
- Medical Properties Trust
- MGM Growth Properties
- Mid-America Apartment Communities
- Minto Apartment REIT
- Morguard REIT
- National Retail Properties
- Northwest Healthcare Properties
- Outfront Media
- Park Hotels & Resorts
- Phillips Edison & Company
- PotlatchDeltic
- PREIT
- Primaris REIT
- Prologis
- PS Business Parks
- Public Storage
- Quality Technology Services
- Rayonier
- Realty Income
- Regency Centers
- RioCan REIT
- RPT Realty
- Ryman Hospitality Properties
- SBA Communications
- Simon Property Group
- SITE Centers
- SL Green Realty
- SmartCentres REIT
- Southwest Value Partners
- Starwood Property Trust
- Store Capital
- Sun Communities
- Tanger Factory Outlet Centers
- UDR
- UMH Properties
- Urstadt Biddle Properties
- Ventas
- Veris Residential
- Vici Properties
- Vivmark Residential
- Vornado Realty Trust
- W. P. Carey
- Washington Prime Group
- Welltower
- Weyerhaeuser
- Xenia Hotels & Resorts

=== Asia ===
- Champion REIT
- Dexus
- Goodman Group
- GPT Group
- Hui Xian REIT
- Link REIT
- Stockland
- Vicinity Centres

=== EMEA ===
- Apache Capital Partners
- Big Yellow Group
- British Land
- Briston
- Cofinimmo
- Derwent London
- Great Portland Estates
- Hammerson
- Hansteen Holdings
- Intu
- Irish Residential Properties REIT
- Landsec
- LondonMetric Property
- NewRiver
- Primary Health Properties
- Safestore
- Shaftesbury
- Soho Estates
- Segro
- Unite Students
- Workspace Group

== See also ==
- List of asset management firms
- List of private-equity firms
- Private equity real estate
- Real estate investment trust
