= DNE =

DNE may refer to:

- The convention of circling important information (such as URLs, or assignments) and marking it DNE (short for do not erase) on chalkboards in academic institutions with shared lecture facilities.
- In mathematics it may be used as an abbreviation to illustrate that a proper solution to some problem Does Not Exist.
- In logic it may be used as an abbreviation referring to the law of double negation elimination.
- In engineering it may be used as an abbreviation to illustrate the relation between variables, X1 Does Not Equal X2.
- An abbreviation for "Did not enter" or "Do not enter"
- An abbreviation for "Do not engage"
- Do not equip, a term sometimes used in printed circuit board design to denote the omitting of a component
- The National Livestock Department (Direction Nationale d'Elevage – DNE) of Mauritania, which manages different aspects of agriculture in that nation
- Defining New Elegance – an English urban catchphrase by Alexander Hunter-Heslop, an international lifestyle critic
- Direcção Nacional de Estatística, the national bureau for statistics of East Timor
- D.Ne., an abbreviation used for the United States District Court for the District of Nebraska
- Deterministic Network Enhancer, Citrix software that extends operating systems and network protocol devices and stacks to introduce measurement and controls
- DNE Group – a Chinese real estate investment firm
