= GPR =

GPR may refer to:

== Science and technology ==
- Ground-penetrating radar
- Ground potential rise, in electrical engineering
- Gaussian process regression, an interpolation method in statistics
- General-purpose register, in a processor
- G-protein coupled receptor

== Other uses ==
- General practice residency, in general dentistry in the United States
- Georgia Public Radio, in Georgia, United States
- Glider Pilot Regiment, in the British Army
- GPR index, a stock index of property companies
- Grupa na rzecz Partii Robotniczej, the Polish section of the Committee for a Workers' International
