= Tetragon Financial Group =

US private equity company

- Company type: Public
- Traded as: LSE: TFG; Euronext Amsterdam: TFG.NA
- ISIN: GG00B1RMC548
- Industry: Investment Company
- Founded: 23 June 2005; 20 years ago
- Founder: Paddy Dear; Reade Griffith
- Headquarters: London, United Kingdom
- Products: Investments
- AUM: $42 billion (2023)
- Total assets: US$2.8 billion NAV (2023)
- Website: www.tetragoninv.com

Tetragon Financial Group Limited (Tetragon) is a Guernsey closed-ended investment company founded in 2005. Its non-voting shares are traded on the Euronext exchange in Amsterdam and the Specialist Fund Segment of the main market of the London Stock Exchange.

The firm's investment objective is to generate distributable income and capital appreciation, and it aims to provide stable returns to investors across credit, equity, interest rate, and inflation cycles. Tetragon's investment manager is Tetragon Financial Management (TFM). TFM's investment committee includes Reade Griffith, Paddy Dear and Stephen Prince, and CEO of TFG Asset Management. Tetragon has offices in London and New York.

== History ==
Tetragon Financial Group was founded in 2005. It is registered in Saint Peter Port, Guernsey, in the Channel Islands, and headquartered in the United Kingdom. In 2007, Tetragon went public with an IPO, selling at $10/share, as an Amsterdam-listed closed-end investment company on Euronext. In 2010, Tetragon acquired Lyon Capital Management LLC (LCM) and established a joint venture with John Carrafiell, Sonny Kalsi, and Fred Schmidt of GreenOak Real Estate. In October 2012, Tetragon purchased Polygon Management (Polygon). In 2013, The Hedge Fund Journal listed Polygon as one of the 50 largest hedge fund managers in Europe. In 2014, Tetragon acquired Equitix, an investor, developer, and long-term fund manager of infrastructure and energy-efficient assets in the UK. Equitix has more than $12 billion in assets under management. Also in 2015, Hawke's Point, an asset management company focused on the mining and resource sectors, was formed under the TFG Asset Management umbrella. In 2019, the GreenOak real estate joint venture was merged with Bentall Kennedy to create what is, as of 31 December 2022, an $82.6 billion global real estate platform called BentallGreenOak;

== Business model ==
Tetragon has an investment portfolio with an NAV of $2.8 billion. TFG Asset Management is Tetragon's diversified asset management platform, and as of 31 December 2022 it had over $40 billion in Assets Under Management. TFG Asset Management currently consists of nine asset managers, including Polygon, Acasta Partners, LCM, Equitix, and BentallGreenOak.

== Legal action ==
In July 2011, Daniel Silverstein, a shareholder of Tetragon, sued the firm. The suit was later dismissed in February 2012. In June 2013, Omega Overseas Partners filed a lawsuit against the firm. On 7 August 2014, in an opinion by Judge Richard J. Sullivan, the Court dismissed the Action in its entirety.
