= Northwest Healthcare Properties =

Real estate investment trust

- Company type: Public company
- Traded as: TSX: NWH.UN
- Industry: Real estate investment trust (REIT), Healthcare
- Founder: Paul Dalla Lana
- Headquarters: Toronto, Canada
- Area served: North America, Asia-Pacific, Europe
- Key people: Paul Dalla Lana (CEO), Craig Mitchell (President), Shailen Chande (CFO), Peter Riggin (CAO)
- Website: www.nwhreit.com

Northwest Healthcare Properties is an international real estate investment trust (REIT) based in Toronto, Canada.

== History ==
Northwest Healthcare Properties was founded by Paul Dalla Lana in Toronto in 2004. As a part of Northwest Value Partners, Northwest Healthcare Properties initially started as a local healthcare real estate business in Ontario, Canada and then expanded to Quebec, Alberta, Nova Scotia, Manitoba, and New Brunswick.

Northwest Healthcare Properties became public after its Initial Public Offering (IPO) in 2010. Following its IPO, the company acquired 17 additional properties worth $400 million across Canada by the end of 2014.

In 2012, the REIT expanded to Germany by acquiring The Aldershof health center and, and then in the following year, acquired Medicum Muensterfeld located in Fulda, Germany. Northwest acquired Hospital Infantil Sabará located in the Paulista district of Sao Paulo, Brazil in the same year.

In 2019, Northwest Healthcare Properties announced the acquisition of Medimall in Rotterdam, marking its entrance into the Netherlands.

Northwest Healthcare Properties initiated its operations in the UK by owning a portfolio of six hospitals worth $167 million in London in 2020. Northwest Healthcare Properties bought four hospital portfolios worth $454 million in the UK in the same year.

In 2022, The company entered the US market by acquiring 27 properties worth $765 million in 10 different states.

The REIT spent $71.58 million in a joint venture with GIC, a Singaporean fund management company, to buy Brisbane Hospital in Queensland, Australia. The joint venture fund further raised $2.4 billion in the same year for various healthcare projects and reached a total fundraising of over $6 billion. According to the Sovereign Wealth Fund Institute (SWFI), it is ranked as the 62nd largest REIT by total assets.
