= China Merchants Capital =

Chinese alternative investment firm

China Merchants Capital Management Co., Ltd.
- Native name: 招商局资本投资有限责任公司.
- Company type: Joint venture
- Industry: Investment management
- Founded: 2012; 14 years ago
- Headquarters: Shenzhen, Guangdong, China; Hong Kong
- Key people: Vincent Peng (Chairman); Jian Guo (CEO)
- Products: Private equity Venture Capital; Fund of funds Real estate
- AUM: US$43 billion (January 2023)
- Owners: China Merchants Group (50%); GLP (50%)
- Number of employees: 260 (2020)
- Website: www.cmcapital.com.cn

China Merchants Capital (CMC) (Chinese: 招商局资本; pinyin: Zhāoshāngjú Zīběn) is a Chinese alternative investment firm founded in 2012 that is headquartered in Shenzhen and Hong Kong. It is currently a joint venture (JV) between China Merchants Group (CMG) and GLP.

In June 2021, Private Equity International ranked CMC as the largest private equity firm in Asia-Pacific based on total fundraising over the most recent five-year period.

In June 2024, China Merchants Capital ranked 48th in Private Equity International's PEI 300 ranking among the world's largest private equity firms.

== Background ==
CMC was originally the investment arm of CMG before being officially launched as a fully-fledged private equity manager in 2012.

On 11 October 2019, GLP announced that it would acquire 50% of CMC from CMG. Going forward CMC would be co-managed by both CMG and GLP.

As of November 2020, CMC manages 37 private equity funds in seven different sectors and has 260 employees. Its largest fund is the Yinhe Equity Investment Fund which is a fund of funds that invests in CMC funds. Its funds typically tend to have a seven-year term that comprises a three to four-year investment period, two years to three years for divestiture and an optional one year add on.

CMC's capital comes from both government entities and private businesses. Notable investors include financial institutions such as Agricultural Bank of China, Mizuho Securities and SoftBank Group.

== Notable deals ==
In November 2019, CMC and ESR Group launched the ESR Australia Logistics Trust, a A$350 million logistics real estate fund that would invest in Australian assets.

In November 2022, CMC was exploring a takeover offer for Chinese data center operator Chindata. It was listed on the Nasdaq and was backed by Bain Capital. In June 2023, CMC made a bid of $3.4 billion to rival Bain Capital's offer to privatize Chindata. In August 2023, Chindata decided to go with Bain Capital's offer over CMC in a $3.16 billion deal.
