= 1250 René-Lévesque =

Office skyscraper in Montreal, Quebec, Canada and tallest building in Quebec

1250, boulevard René-Lévesque
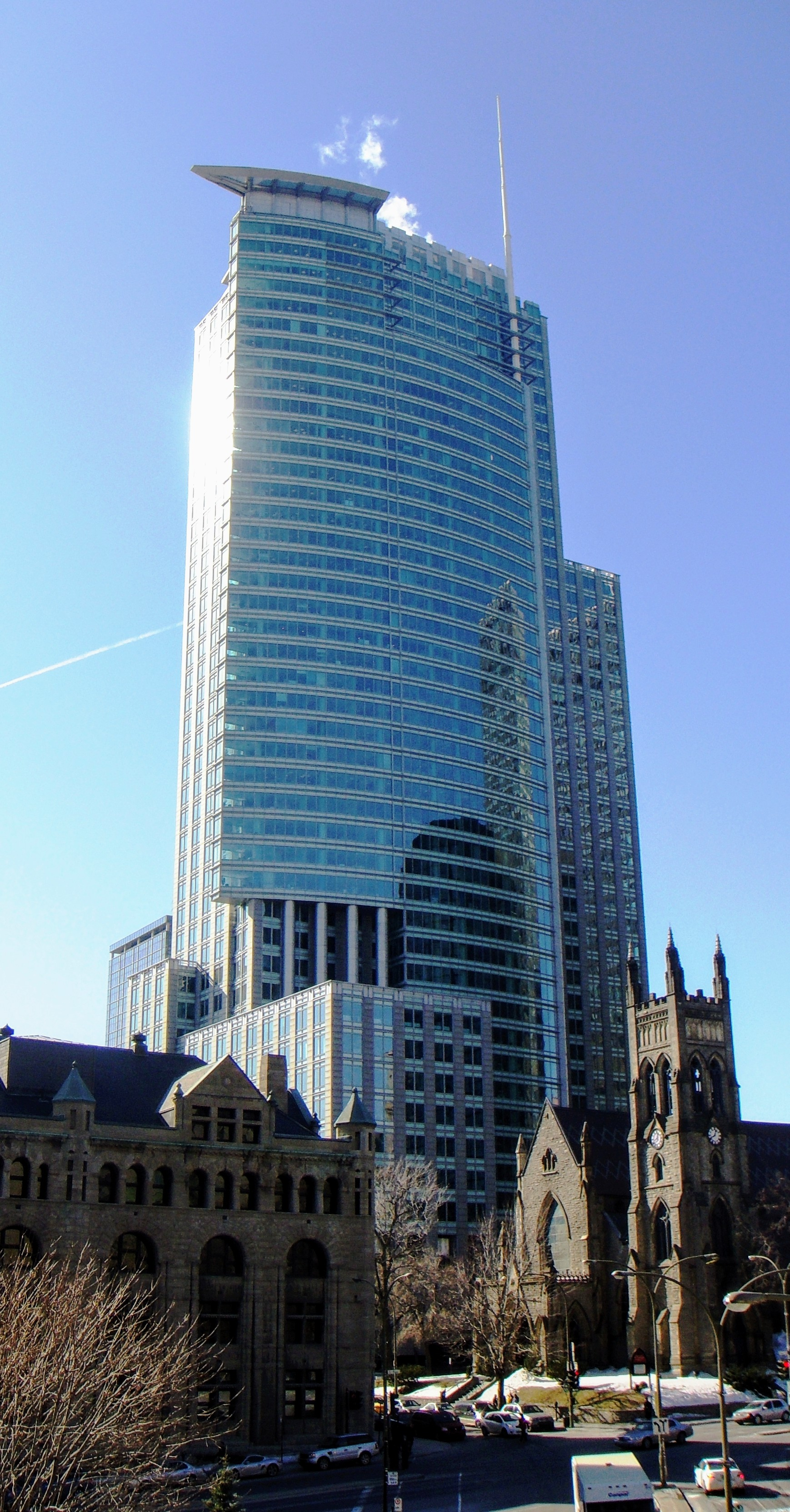
- 1250 René-Lévesque

General information
- Type: Office
- Architectural style: Postmodern and Neo-modern
- Location: 1250 René-Lévesque Boulevard, Montreal, Quebec, Canada
- Coordinates: 45.497323°N 73.570381°W
- Completed: 1992
- Owner: BentallGreenOak (Sunlife)
- Operator: BentallGreenOak

Height
- Architectural: 226.5 metres (743 ft)
- Antenna spire: 226.5 m
- Roof: 199 metres (653 ft)

Technical details
- Floor count: 47
- Floor area: 95,237 square metres (1,025,120 sq ft)
- Lifts/elevators: 28

Design and construction
- Architect: Kohn Pedersen Fox Associates
- Structural engineer: LeMessurier Consultants

Website
- bentallgreenoakleasing.com/building/7583901489388302059?search=

1250 René-Lévesque, formerly known as the "IBM-Marathon Tower," is Montreal, Canada's second-tallest skyscraper, with a roof height of 199 meters (without its spire), and a total height of 226.5 meters including the spire. The height definition follows the city’s National Building Code, which excludes decorative spires, whereas the international Council on Tall Buildings and Urban Habitat (CTBUH) includes it, making it Montreal’s tallest building.

This 47-story skyscraper was designed by Kohn Pedersen Fox Associates and completed in 1992. It was constructed between 1988 and 1992 as a project led by IBM and Marathon Realty with an investment of $250 million to consolidate IBM’s operations in Montreal, relocating 1,000 employees from Place Ville Marie.

The building’s location in downtown Montreal serves as a visual boundary between the commercial center and the historically residential west side, a concept inspired by KPF’s Westend Tower in Frankfurt, Germany. It is located next to Bell Centre and Windsor Station, and is connected to the Bonaventure metro station and Montreal’s Underground City.

== Architecture ==
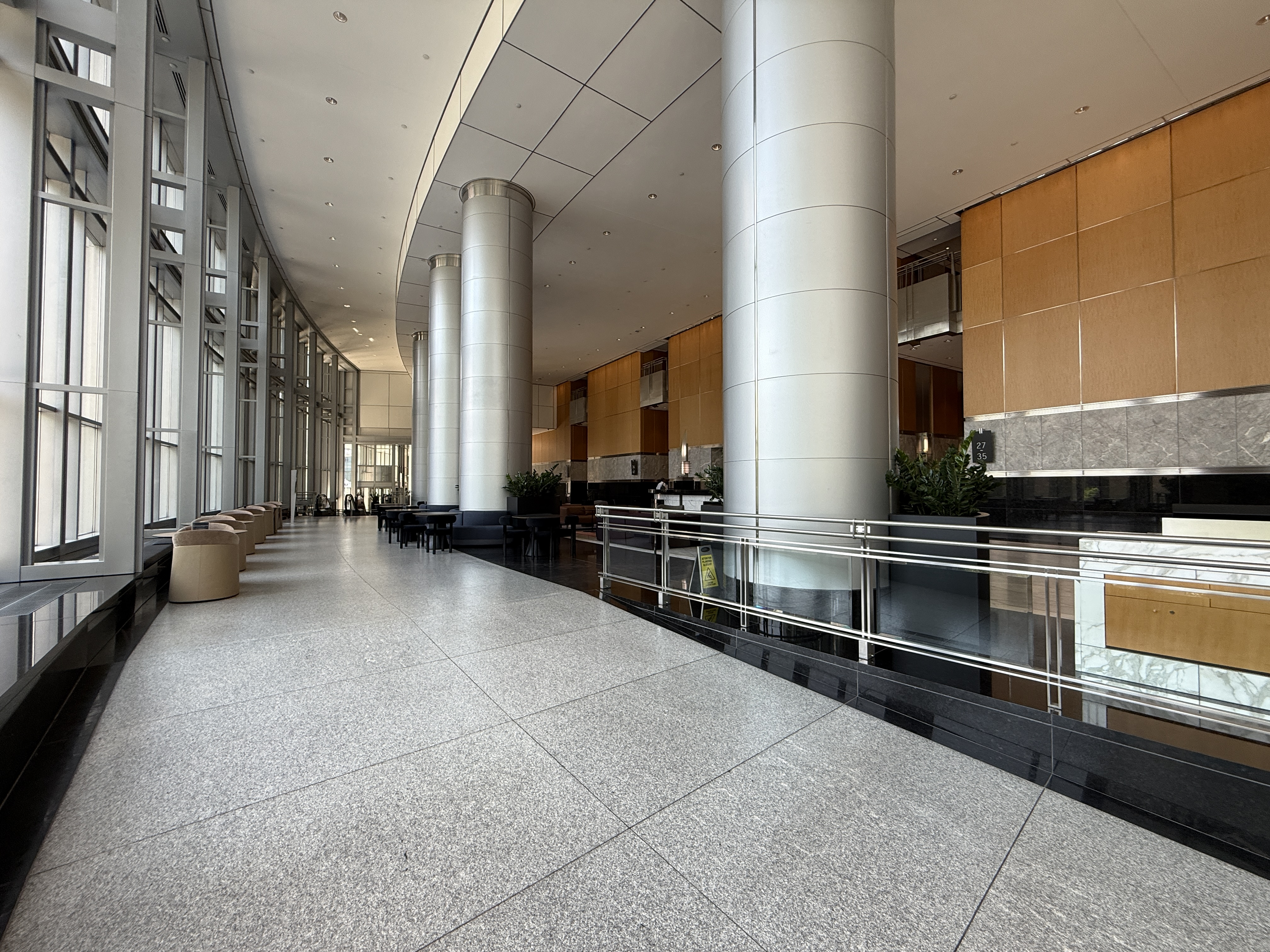
Office lobby

The building’s architecture combines postmodern and neo-modern styles. Its east and west facades differ distinctly: the west facade is a granite-clad wall with square windows and irregular setbacks, facing the residential periphery, while the east facade features a curved glass curtain wall facing the city center, giving a light, suspended effect. A spire extends along the building’s north side, reaching 31 meters beyond the rooftop, aligning with Mount Royal's peak elevation.

Inside, a four-story atrium with a bamboo winter garden, food court, and conference rooms creates a welcoming space. The building connects to Montreal’s Underground City and Bonaventure metro station.

== Location and urban integration ==
Initially intended to be positioned at the edge of downtown Montreal, further development has caused 1250 René-Lévesque to be incorporated into a larger commercial area. The smaller buildings to the west create a staircase effect, guiding the eye from the commercial core toward 1250 René-Lévesque.

== Tenants ==
Major tenants include IBM, Air Liquide, PwC, Deutsche Bank, PSP Investments, and many others in financial, technology, and consulting industries.

- Air Liquide Canada
- Bayer
- BMO Harris Bank
- Canaccord Financial Inc
- Chubb Corp.
- CIBC Wood Gundy
- Credit Suisse
- Deutsche Bank
- Equisoft
- International Cospas-Sarsat Programme
- Insight Enterprises
- Langlois Lawyers LLP
- LASIK MD
- Lazard
- Macquarie Group
- McKinsey & Company
- Merrill Lynch Canada
- Michael Page International
- PSP Investments
- PricewaterhouseCoopers
- Richardson GMP Limited
- Wells Fargo Equipment Finance

== Former tenants ==
- Club Privé 47 Inc was located on the 47th floor (between 1995-2011) and was a swinger club.

== Gallery ==
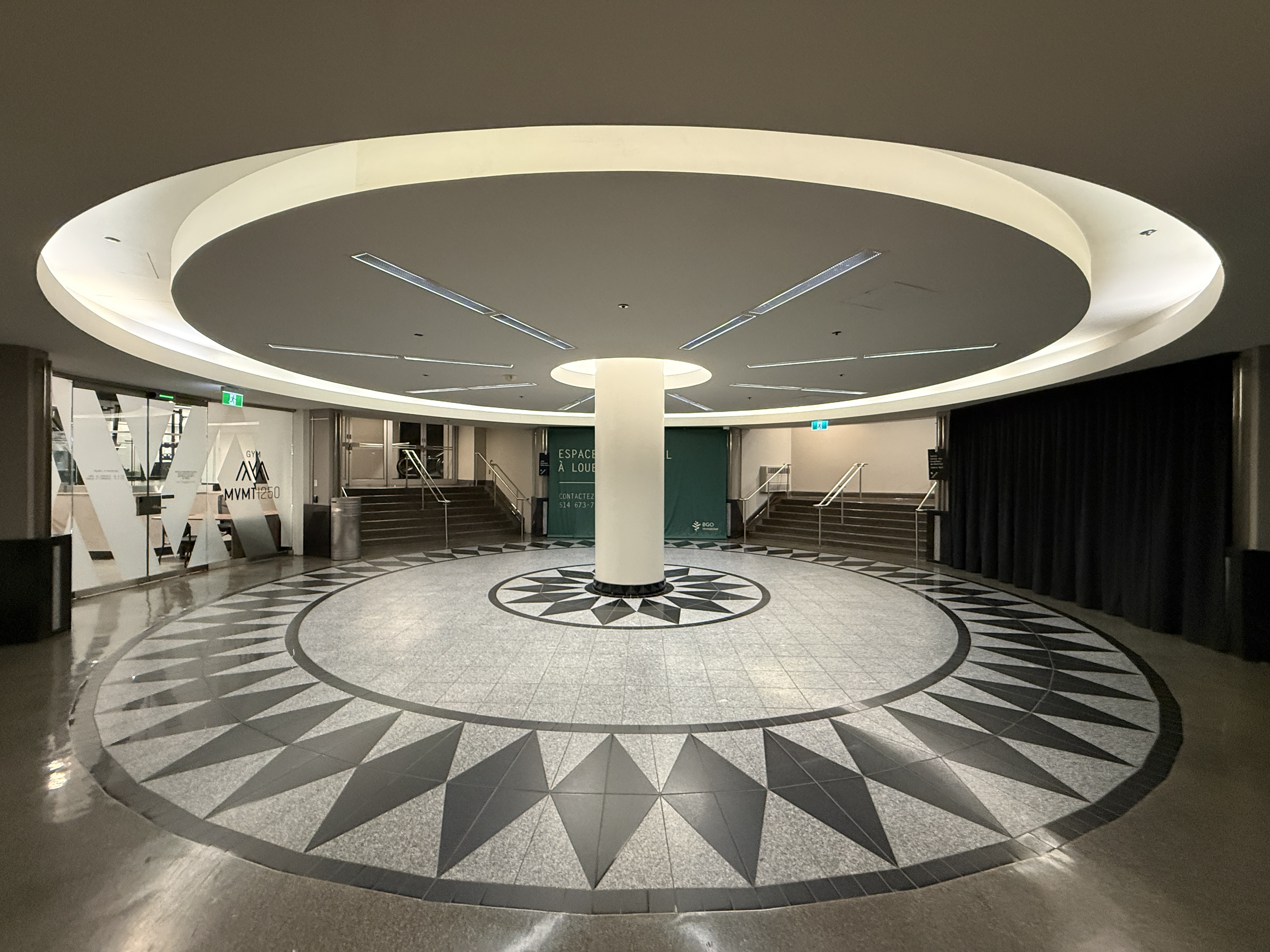
Basement arcade

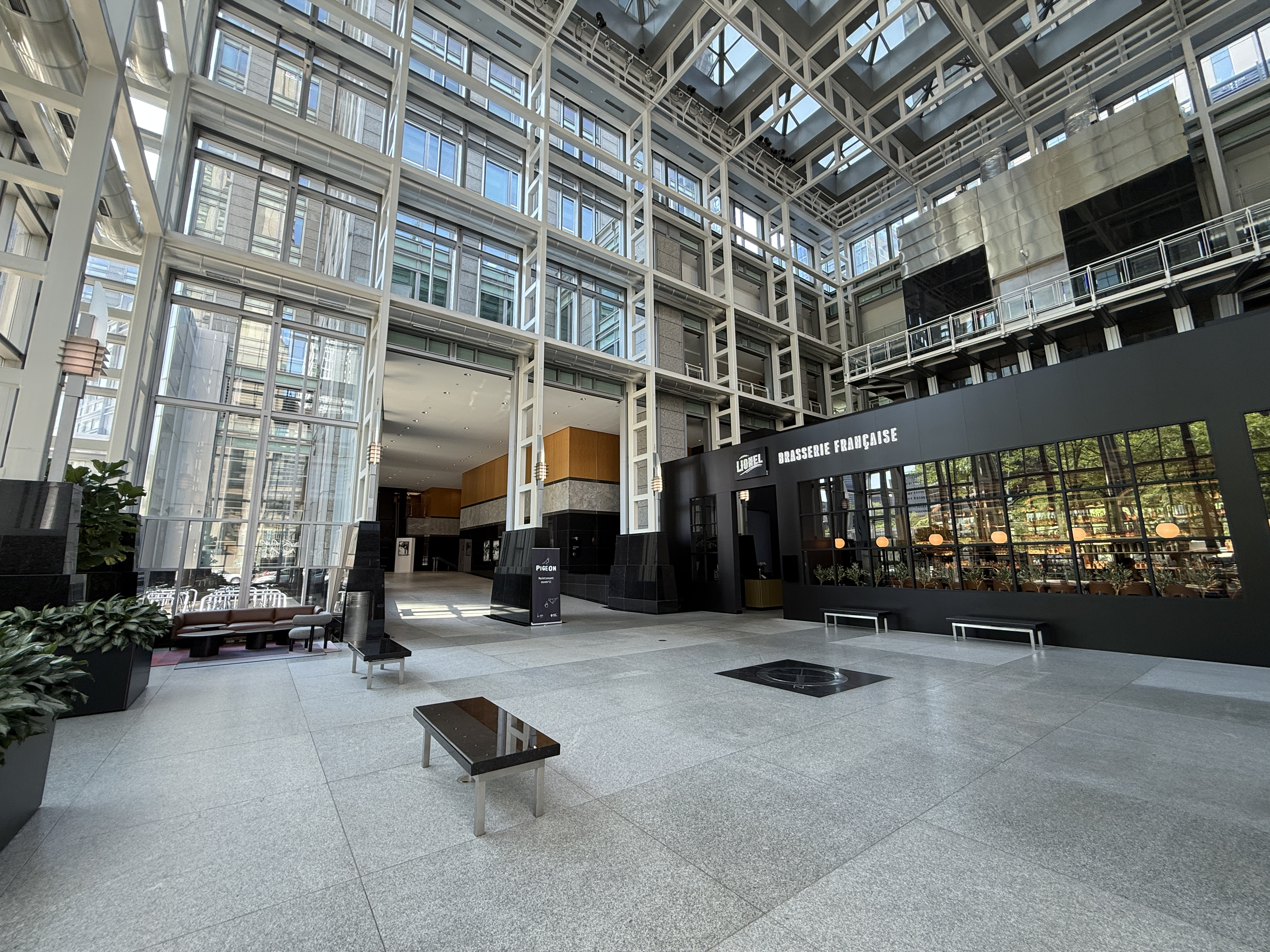
Atrium in ground level

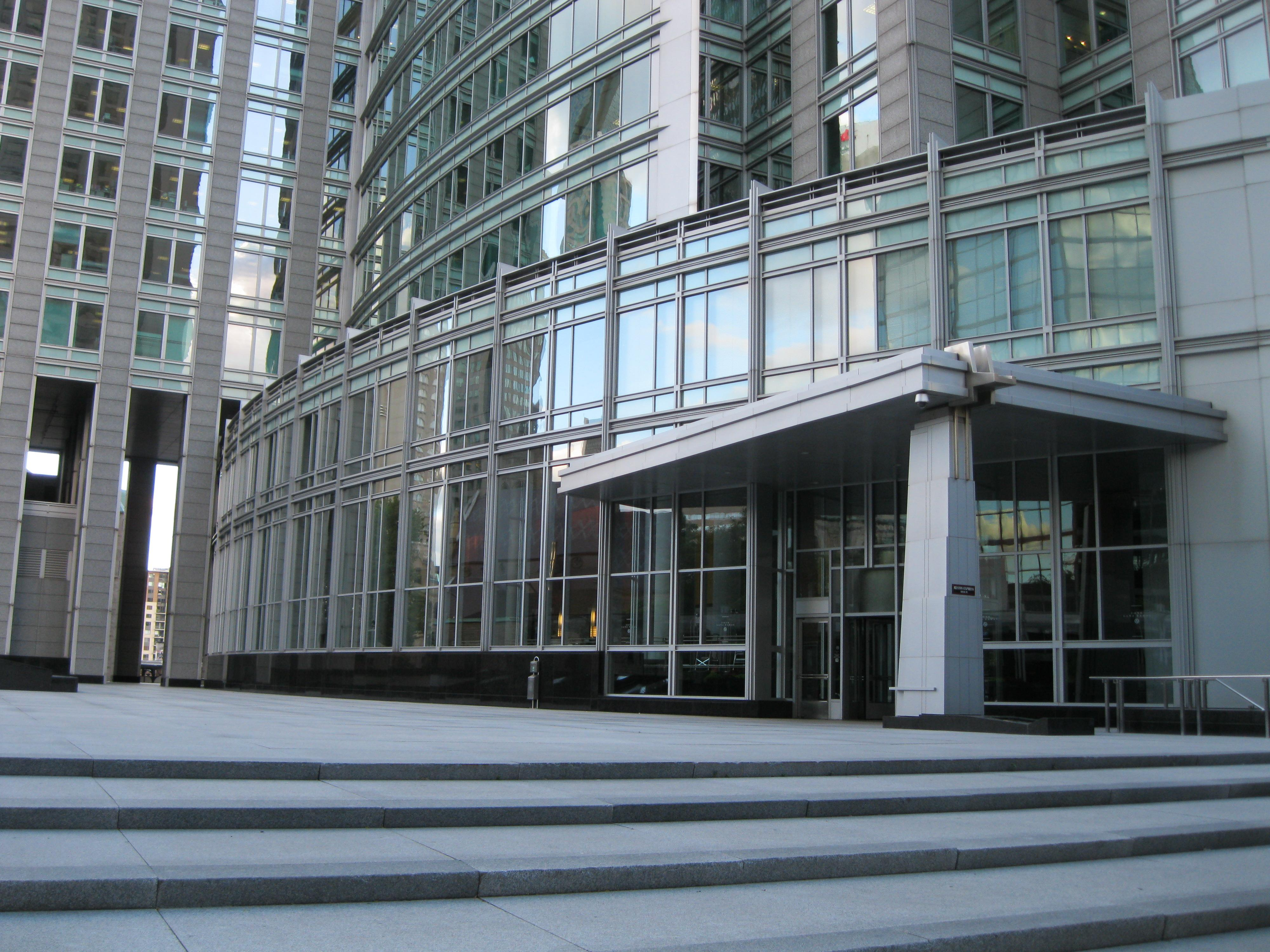
Close-up of 1250 René-Lévesque.

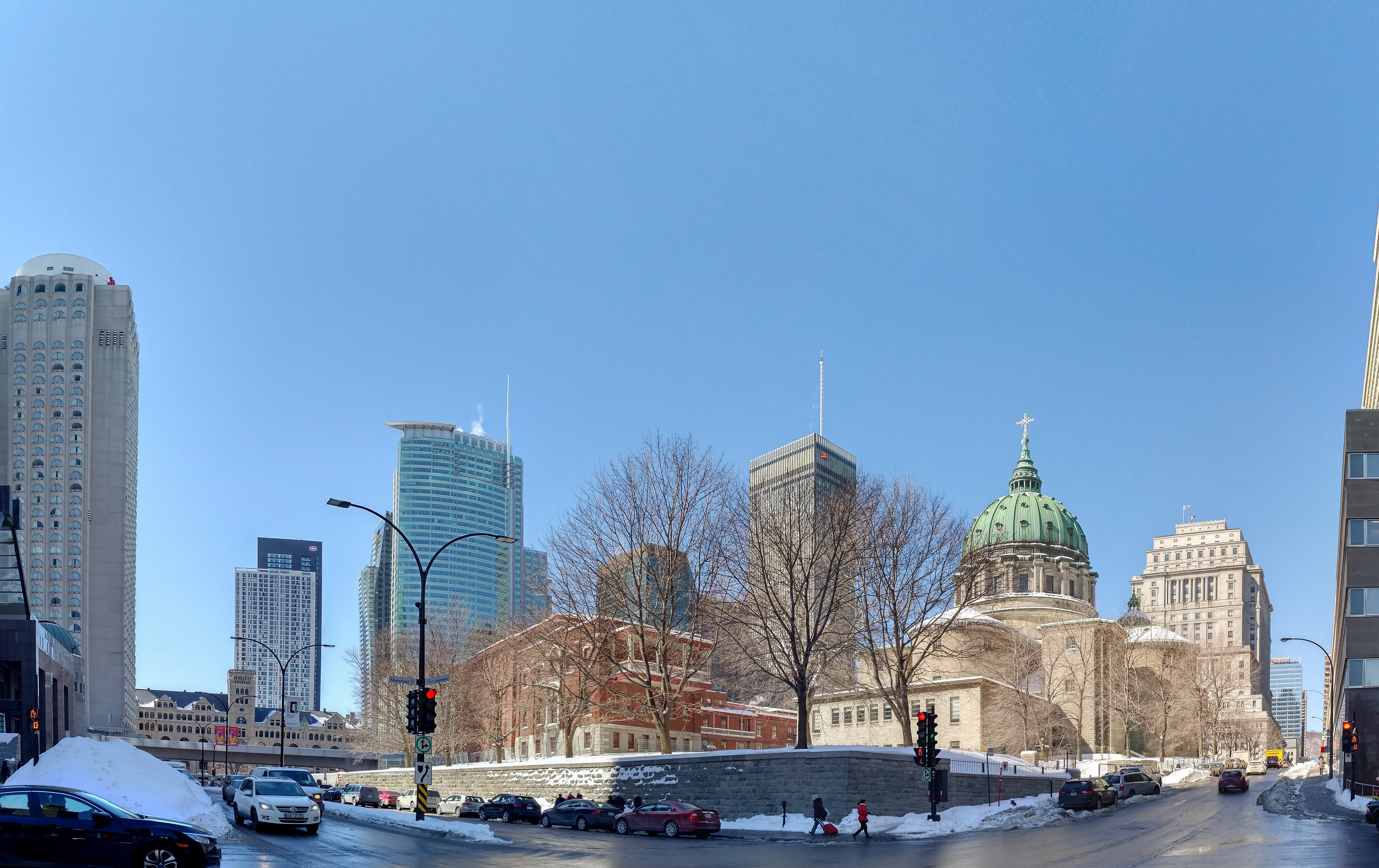
Montreal skyline near Mansfield and De La Gauchetière, showing 1250 René-Lévesque..

== See also ==
- List of tallest buildings in Montreal
