= John Carrafiell =

American businessman

- Born: John Anthony Carrafiell; March 8, 1965 (age 61)
- Education: Yale University
- Title: Co-CEO of BentallGreenOak

John Carrafiell (born March 8, 1965) is an American businessman and real estate investor and the Co-CEO of BentallGreenOak.

== Education ==
Carrafiell received his B.A. from Yale University in 1987.

== Career ==
Carrafiell joined Morgan Stanley in 1987 and held various management positions there from 1994 to 2009 including: ehad of acquisitions for Morgan Stanley Real Estate Funds’ European Investment Program (1994); head of Morgan Stanley’s European real estate group (1995); managing director (1999); global co-head of the Morgan Stanley Real Estate Division and member of the investment banking operating committee(2005); president of the Special Situations Fund III (2006); and senior advisor (2009).

In 2004, after the Morgan Stanley-led £1.7 billion takeover of Canary Wharf, Carrafiell became a member of the board of Canary Wharf, chairman of the audit committee and member of the operating management committee. Carrafiell formed Alpha Real Estate Advisors in 2008 which advised Songbird Estates PLC (controlling owner of Canary Wharf) in its £1.03 billion recapitalization.

In 2010, Carrafiell co-founded GreenOak Real Estate, a private equity real estate firm with investments in the United States, Japan, the UK and Spain.

In 2019, Carrafiell's GreenOak merged with Bentall Kennedy to become BentallGreenOak. In July 2021 the firm became BGO, where Carrafiell remains co-CEO and is also board director. BGO is a real estate investment firm with $83 billion in assets across 13 countries. Carrafiell follows an investment thesis based on traditional real estate judgement blended with data analytics, which has been increasingly effective in predicting trends in various real estate markets.

In 2021, Carrafiell joined the board of Lineage Logistics, the world's largest company providing refrigeration logistics.

== Directorships ==
Carrafiell is currently serving on the Supervisory Board of Klepierre.

He previously sat on the Management Board of the European Public Real Estate Association (EPRA) and on the Supervisory Boards of Corio and Deutsche Immobilien Chancen Group. Carrafiell also served as a Trustee of the Urban Land Institute and as a Director of the Canary Wharf Group and Grupo Lar.

== Philanthropy ==
Carrafiell has established scholarship and teaching funds to support students, teaching, and research at the Yale School of Architecture. He also established a scholarship fund for the Yale School of Art. He is a member of the Yale School of Architecture Deans’ Council.

Carrafiell is a supporter of the Ever Episcopal Campaign and is a member of the Tate Modern (London) Acquisitions Committee.

In 2024, he contributed part of $25 million in funding for the Institute of Contemporary Art, Miami to acquire the former site of the neighboring De la Cruz Collection.
