= International Sustainability Alliance =

Defunct British trade alliance to improve the built environment

- Abbreviation: ISA
- Formation: September 8, 2010
- Dissolved: July 2, 2019
- Type: trade association
- Legal status: Alliance
- Purpose: Create a more sustainable built environment
- Location: Garston, Hertfordshire, United Kingdom
- Region served: Worldwide
- Services: Bring together global network of real estate leaders (developers, owners, occupiers and investors)
- Parent organization: Building Research Establishment (BRE)
- Funding: Members fees
- Website: internationalsustainabilityalliance.org

The International Sustainability Alliance (ISA) was a global network of corporate occupiers, property investors, developers and owners of commercial buildings, who share best practice in the sustainable management of their property portfolios.

ISA was dedicated to achieving a more sustainable built environment through the better measurement, benchmarking and understanding of building performance. The alliance was founded in 2010 and dissolved in 2019.

== Purpose ==
With 40% of carbon emissions coming from the built environment, real estate owners, occupiers, developers and funders around the world were facing ever increasing demands concerning the need for greater sustainability in the use of existing buildings.

ISA is a response to the growing legislative and economic pressure across the world to address building sustainability. It helps members to develop a common understanding of how their buildings perform, what measures can be taken to improve them and what this means in terms of value and return on their investment.

ISA had a database of commercial building assets comprising information gathered from members with retail, office and other commercial buildings in more than 50 countries. The diversity and breadth of data acquired from members—and in turn available to them—provided a resource on which to base decisions on investing in their buildings.

A key purpose of ISA was the provision of robust benchmarking services based on a very extensive and detailed body of data. ISA also promoted research on sustainability in the built environment.

== Activities ==
Production of an Annual Report for each Founding and General Member, containing an assessment of the property data placed in the ISA database by members, which can help them to reduce CO_{2} emissions, preserve water resources and make well informed investment decisions.

KPI Benchmarking – the Annual Report contains an analysis of current ISA key performance indicators (KPIs), which include energy, CO_{2}, waste and water – at site, building and asset level – by country and sector. This enables members to benchmark their property portfolio within their organisation and against other companies that have provided data.

Reporting – the KPIs are aligned to the Global Reporting Index Commercial Real Estate Sustainability Supplement (GRI CRESS) and the European Public Real Estate Association (EPRA) standards. This enables ISA members to incorporate their results into both their Annual Reports and Corporate Social Responsibility reports in a standardised way.

Certification – ISA provides a gateway for access to certification of the environmental performance of buildings in use through schemes such as BREEAM In-Use.

Research – ISA promotes scientifically based research into sustainability in the built environment for the benefit of members and the wider community.

== Structure ==
ISA was hosted by BRE Global Limited. The day-to-day running of the organisation is coordinated by Building Research Establishment (BRE) with Task Teams, drawn from the Membership, established to carry out specific activities as and when required.

Members included some of the largest corporations, developers, property owners and investors with worldwide interests. There was a range of membership categories designed to suit the varying requirements of ISA members.
