= Quintessential (company) =

Australian property developer

Quintessential Equity
- Industry: Property development, Property fund management
- Founded: 2010; 16 years ago
- Founders: Shane Quinn; Harry Rosenberg
- Headquarters: Melbourne, Australia
- Area served: Australia (including Brisbane, Parramatta, Canberra)
- Key people: Shane Quinn, Harry Rosenberg

Quintessential Equity is an Australian property developer and unlisted property fund manager. Through syndicates, it offers investment in specific properties, suitable for high-net-worth individuals.

It was founded by Shane Quinn and Harry Rosenberg in 2010 and is based in Melbourne.

Its office tower purchasing strategy is to buy at market lows in localities that have potential for superior performance. For example 240 Queen Street in Brisbane was purchased in 2024 for A$250 million after negotiations with owner Brookfield who had initially valued the property at up to $300 million.

In January 2015 it sold an office building in Parramatta after a 40% sell-off commitment in 2014 to bolster investor returns.

It bought the Department of Foreign Affairs and Trade-tenanted 44 Sydney Avenue in Canberra in 2015 for $32 million and sold it for $58.6 million in 2017.
