= The Bookplace =

Defunct bookshop in London

Coordinates: 51.4738°N 0.0729°W

The BookPlace
- Industry: Bookshop Publisher
- Founded: 1977
- Founder: John Willis, Tanya Whitty
- Defunct: 1996
- Headquarters: 13 Peckham High Street, London, SE15; United Kingdom
- Number of locations: 1
- Key people: Richard Gray
- Services: Bookselling; Publishers; Adult Education; Book fairs

The Bookplace was a radical community bookshop at 13 Peckham High Street, Peckham, south east London which was open 1977–1996.

The shop sold black literature, women's writing, children's books, local press as well as mainstream publications. Aside from selling books the building acted as radical community space; the upper floor providing meeting space and adult education classes.

The Peckham Literacy Centre, which took the upstairs floor, also provided space for the Peckham Publishing Project and Peckham People's History group. These projects together gave (often black, working class and/or female) local residents resources, platforms and the ability to publish and share their stories.

The Bookplace would provide services to local schools, providing them with books and booklists, running anti-racist audits on their existing book stock, giving talks to students and would invite them to their regular book fairs. Their newsletter highlighted to schools that many of their children's books "offer alternatives to the standard white middle-class characters".

Book sales would go towards the Peckham Literacy Centre's educational programmes but The Bookplace was otherwise funded by Southwark Council, Greater London Arts Association, the Inner London Education Authority at various points.

The Bookplace was considered the "daughter of Centerprise bookshop" in East London, which opened shortly before and shared similar values and purpose to other radical community bookshops across London at the time such as New Beacon Books in Finsbury Park, the Walter Rodney Bookshop in Ealing and THAP in Whitechapel.

== History ==
The bookshop opened on 12 November 1977 after much building work done on a volunteer basis, including by local school children. The opening ceremony was attended by local councillor Ann Ward and Sam Silkin MP. Approximately six months later, the Peckham Literacy Centre began classes and later published its first title under its Peckham Publishing Project arm.

In 1987, The Bookplace was threatened with closure and the building was put up for auction. This was a result of the disbanding of the Greater London Council, and all buildings owned by the GLC were put up for auction by the London Residuary Body. A successful local campaign arose fighting against the sale, including an occupation of Peckham High Street that stopped traffic and input from local MP Harriet Harman which resulted in Southwark Council purchasing the building in order for The Bookplace to continue its activities.

The Bookplace eventually closed in 1996. The building is now occupied by Lux Fabrics.

=== Other activities ===
The Peckham People's History Group formed in 1982 after the Peckham Publishing Project found they needed more focus after already publishing 3 books on local history.

The Bookplace would hold regular bookfairs in the local community including at the North Peckham Estate's Camden estate tenants hall, All Saints Hall on Bleinheim Grove and Bells Garden Tenants Hall on Buller Close. these fairs would sell books as well as having steel pan bands, clowns, badge making and street theatre. One poster read "Lots of fun for adults and kids!".

The Peckham Literacy Centre would hold classes in English reading and writing, computer skills, project management.

Members of The Bookplace could vote in the organisation's AGM and use the building's equipment such as computers, electric typewriters and the photocopier.

=== Legacy ===
The South London Gallery held an exhibition 'Back to The Bookplace' in 2019 displaying photographs, books and other ephemera. The gallery's Walk it, Talk it series invited local current bookseller Books Peckham to curate a walking tour map celebrating The Bookplace and other sites of radical publishing in Peckham.

Southwark Archives hold collections of ephemera from The Bookplace, that can be viewed by visiting them. Items from this collection were lent to South London Gallery for the 2019 exhibition.

Historian Stephen Bourne said that The Bookplace gave him the first encouragement to write historical works, he said "It was a wonderful place, really encouraging" in an interview in the Peckham Peculiar newspaper in October 2017.

== Publishing ==
The Peckham Publishing Project advertised that they would "publish work by and for local people" and would go on to publish numerous titles 1978–1984. The main leader of the project was Richard Gray who had previously worked at Hackney's Centerprise bookshop.

Published books covered local history, Afro-Caribbean subjects, recipes, novels and children's literature.

Some of the titles published were by the centre's People's History Group, which recorded the experiences of local people. One example was local residents' experiences at the Pioneer Health Centre. A recipe book published was collectively written by Caribbean members of the community and was illustrated by children from Collingwood Girls School in Peckham. Marcellus by Lorraine Simeon, a picture book that told a story in verse about a schoolboy with dreadlocks, was subsequently printed by other publishers worldwide and a further book featuring Marcellus was published.

=== Works published ===
- Every morning by Tanya Whitty (1978)
- The school cooks by Tanya Whitty (1978)
- Love & trouble by Colleen Skeete (1978)
- Muriel's Book by Muriel Kinlocke (1978)
- Looking Back: Photos of Camberwell and Peckham 1890–1918 (1979)
- The lost dog by Chris Abuk (1979)
- Peckham Poets (1979)
- Milk River – Writing about Jamaica and St. Lucia by Simon Lawrence (1979)
- I Want to Write it Down: Writing by Women in Peckham (1980)
- I Was a Walworth Boy by John Bennett (1980)
- A Second Chance by Delroy Smith (1981)
- Captain Blackbeard's Beef Creole : and other Caribbean recipes (1981)
- How to Make a Book (1982)
- Never Trust a Camel (1982)
- On The Roof by Graham Jameson (1983)
- The Times of Our Lives : (growing up in the Southwark area, 1900–1945) by Peckham People's History Group (1983)
- Godfers by Jim Allen (1983)
- Our Kids (1984)
- Marcellus by Lorraine Simeon (1984, ISBN 0906464099)
