= Hui Xian =

Huixian or Hui Xian may refer to:

== Places in China ==
- Huixian, a county-level city in Henan
- Hui County, or Huixian, a county in Gansu
- Huixian, Guangxi (会仙), a town in Guilin, Guangxi

== Others ==
- Hui Xian REIT, a RMB-denominated real estate investment trust based in Hong Kong
- Xian Hui (born 1958), or Hui Xian in the Western name order, Chinese politician
