= Bridge Investment Group =

American real estate investment company

Bridge Investment Group Holdings Inc.
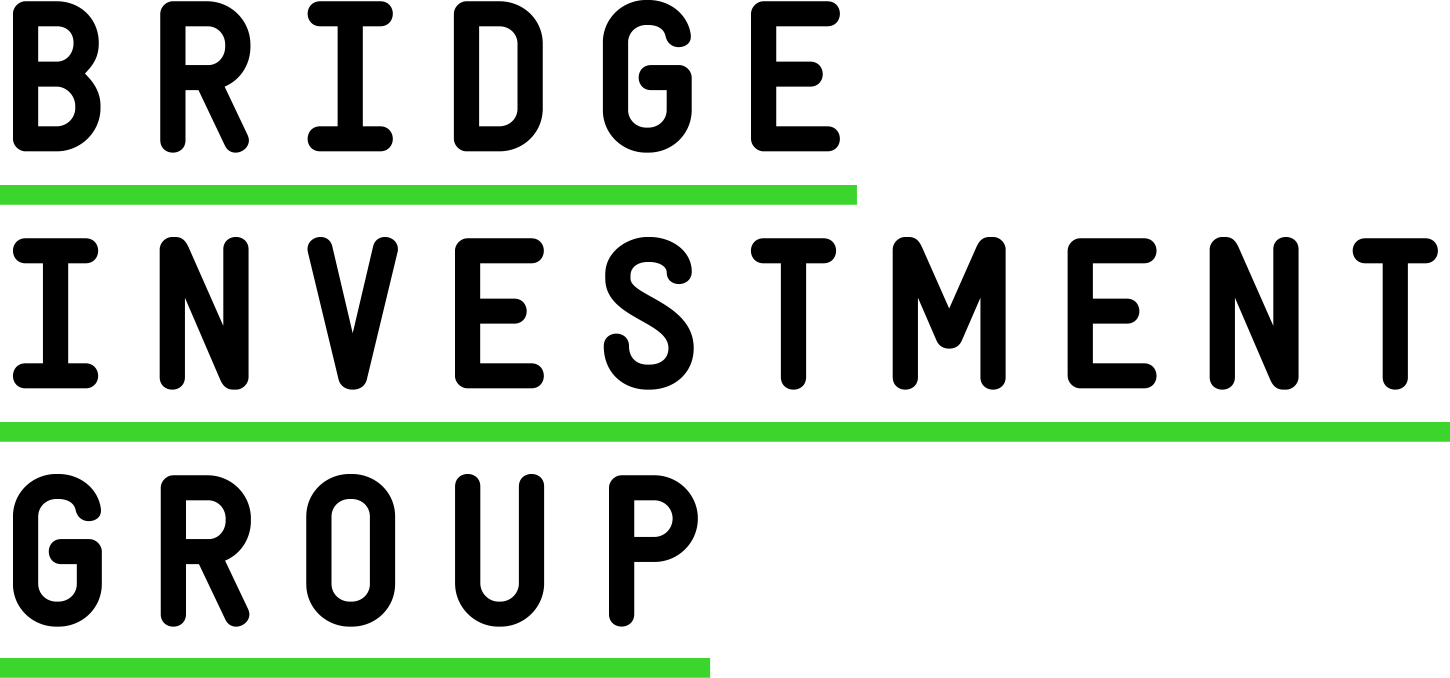
- Type: Private
- Traded as: NYSE: BRDG; (formerly)
- Industry: Investment management
- Founded: 2009; 17 years ago
- Headquarters: Salt Lake City, Utah, United States
- Key people: Robert Morse (chairman); Jonathan Slager (CEO)
- Products: Alternative investments Private equity real estate Private credit
- AUM: ▲$47.7 billion (2024)
- Owner: Apollo Global Management
- Subsidiaries: Newbury Partners
- Website: www.bridgeig.com

Bridge Investment Group Holdings Inc. is an alternative investment company based in Salt Lake City, Utah. Focused on investments in the real estate sector as well as credit investments, it has expanded into other areas such as the private-equity secondary market, property technology, and renewable energy.

== History ==
Bridge Investment Group was founded in 2009. Ten years later, it announced it would be deploying $509 million in capital for projects in opportunity zones.

In January 2021, Bridge announced it had raised almost $2 billion in capital for opportunity zones projects. In July, the firm held an initial public offering becoming a listed company on the New York Stock Exchange at $16 per share.

In 2022, the firm was ranked by PERE (under Private Equity International) as the thirteenth largest private equity real estate company based on total fundraising over the most recent five-year period.

In February 2023, the company acquired private equity firm Newbury Partners in $320.1 million all-cash deal so it could perform activities in the private-equity secondary market. In August, it was reported that investors in Bridge stock had lost 22% over the last year.

In February 2025, asset management firm Apollo Global Management agreed to acquire Bridge for $1.5 billion. On September 2, it was announced that this transaction had been completed.
