= ESR Group =

Hong Kong real estate organisation

ESR Group Limited

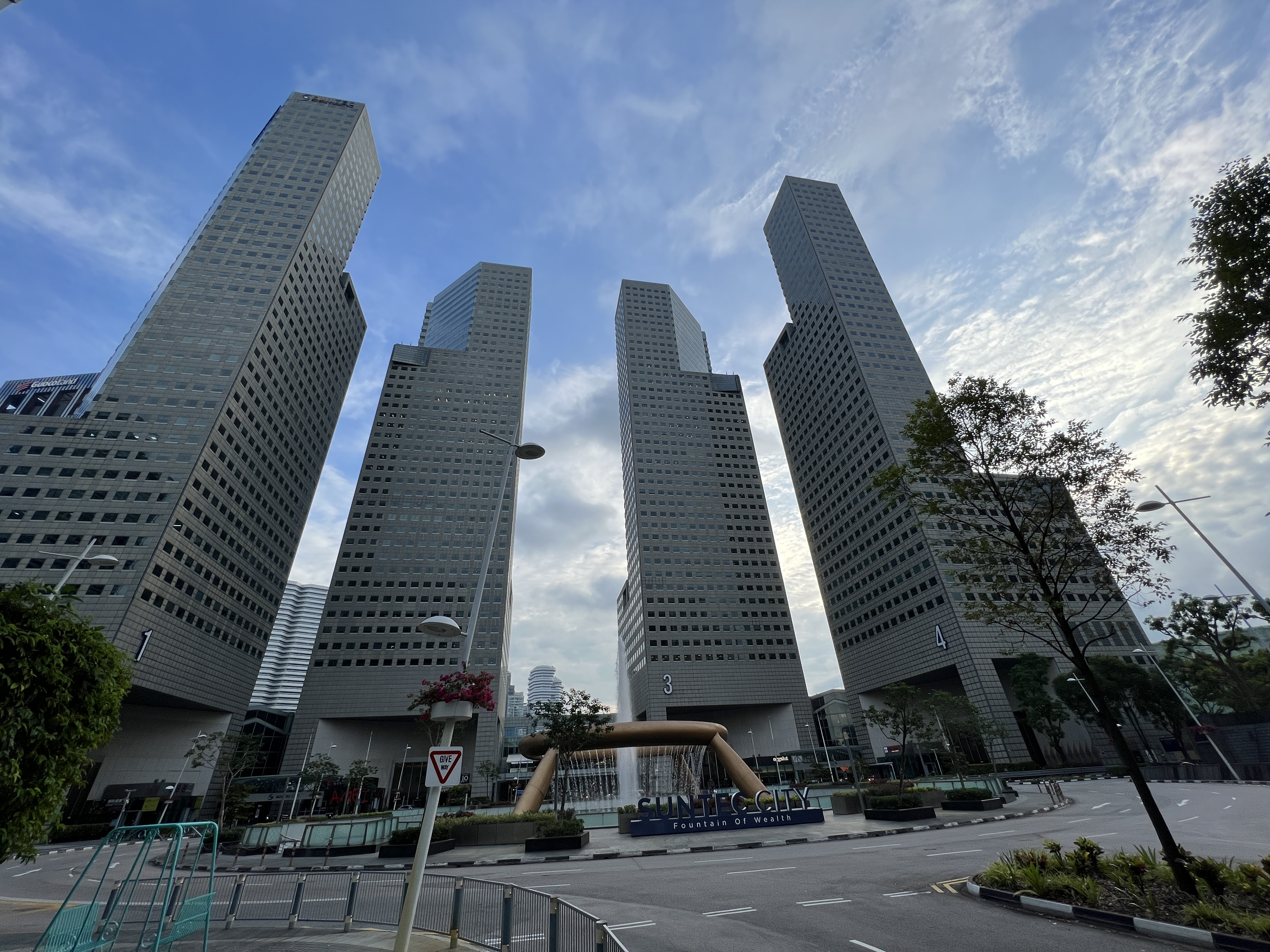
- Headquarters at Suntec Tower 5, Singapore
- Trade name: ESR
- Formerly: ESR Cayman
- Type: Private
- Industry: Real Estate
- Founded: January 2016; 10 years ago
- Founder: Shen Jinchu; Stuart Gibson; Charles Alexander de Portes
- Headquarters: Singapore,
- Key people: Brett Robson (Independent Board Chair); Jeffrey Shen (Co-founder and Co-CEO); Stuart Gibson (Co-founder and Co-CEO); Phil Pearce (President)
- Revenue: ▲US$871.33 million (FY 2023)
- Net income: ▼US$268.06 million (FY 2023)
- AUM: ▲US$154 billion (June 2024)
- Total assets: ▼US$16.19 billion (FY 2023)
- Total equity: ▼US$8.73 billion (FY 2023)
- Number of employees: 2,298 (FY 2023)
- Website: www.esr.com

ESR Group Limited (ESR) is an Asia-Pacific focused real estate services and investment company. It focuses on building and managing logistics properties, such as warehouses and distribution centres, as well as data centres. It is incorporated in the Cayman Islands but headquartered in Singapore following a US$7 billion privatisation and subsequent delisting from the Hong Kong Stock Exchange.

Due to its acquisition of ARA Asset Management in 2022, ESR has become one of the largest real estate investment management companies in the world. In 2022, the company was ranked by PERE (under Private Equity International) as the 4th largest Private Equity Real Estate firm based on total fundraising over the most recent five-year period. In 2024, it rose to position 1 in PERE's APAC Fund Manager Guide ranking of the top 50 private equity real estate fund managers.

== History ==
ESR was formed in January 2016 as the result of a merger between e-Shang and the Redwood Group to form e-Shang Redwood, which is better known as ESR. e-Shang was a Shanghai-based logistics platform that was co-founded by Shen Jinchu and Sun Dongping along with private equity firm, Warburg Pincus. The Redwood Group was a Singapore-based logistics platform founded in 2006 by Stuart Gibson and Charles de Portes who were former employees of Prologis.

In November 2018, ESR acquired Sydney based real estate investment manager, Propertylink for $522 million leading to its delisting from the Australian Securities Exchange in 2019.

In June 2019, ESR announced an initial public offering by listing on the Hong Kong Stock Exchange but postponed its plans due to poor market conditions. On 1 November 2019, ESR completed its initial listing where it raised US$1.6 billion.

In August 2021, ESR announced it would acquire Singaporean Real Estate management firm, ARA Asset Management for US$5.2 billion. On 20 January 2022, ESR completed its acquisition of ARA Asset Management. This led to ESR having US$140 billion assets under management making it the third-largest listed real estate investment manager globally. The acquisition also included LOGOS, an Australian logistics real estate firm which was a subsidiary of ARA Asset Management.

In May 2024, ESR announced that Warburg Pincus were in discussions with a consortium that included Starwood Capital Group and Sixth Street Partners to take ESR private. In June 2025, shareholders approved the deal in a $7 billion buyout.

== Business overview ==
ESR has three main business lines.

1. Investments (direct Real estate investing)
2. Fund Management (management of funds and investment vehicles related to properties including REITs)
3. Development (building and sale of logistics properties including land sourcing, design, construction and leasing)

Most of the properties held in ESR's portfolio are Logistics Parks.

As per the 2020 annual report of ESR, most of its top 10 tenants that it leases to are from the e-commerce sector such as Amazon, JD.com, Coupang and Softbank.

ESR is headquartered in Hong Kong and has additional offices in China, Japan, South Korea, Singapore, Australia and India. Almost all its revenue comes from these regions.

== See also ==
- DNE Group
- Warburg Pincus
