= Phoenix Property Investors =

Hong Kong real estate investment firm

Phoenix Property Investors Limited
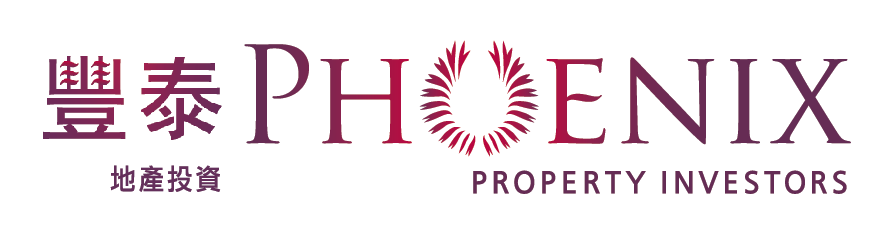
- Native name: 豐泰地產投資有限公司
- Type: Private
- Industry: Private equity real estate
- Founded: 2002; 24 years ago
- Founders: Samuel Chu; Benjamin Lee
- Headquarters: Hong Kong
- AUM: US$17 billion (2026)
- Number of employees: 180 (2026)
- Website: www.ppinvestors.com

Phoenix Property Investors ("Phoenix") is a real estate investment firm headquartered in Hong Kong. In 2022, IREI ranked Phoenix as the tenth largest real estate manager in Asia based on assets under management (AUM).

== Background ==
Phoenix was founded in 2002 by Samuel Chu and Benjamin Lee. The firm takes a value driven approach to investing in real estate in and works with institutional clients such as sovereign wealth funds, pension funds and insurance companies.

Phoenix has investments across the Asia Pacific region with a focus on Developed Markets including countries such as Japan, Australia, South Korea and Hong Kong. The firm is headquartered in Hong Kong with additional offices in China, Japan, Korea, Singapore, Taiwan and Australia.

In 2020, Phoenix had to restructure its financing for investments in Beijing and Shanghai due to market turndown caused by the COVID-19 pandemic.

In May 2022, Phoenix sued WeWork for abandoning a 10 year commitment to Tower 535 in Hong Kong. Phoenix demanded a payment of about HK$242 million (US$30.8 million) on the alleged breach of contract.

In June 2023, Phoenix and Lendlease entered a joint venture to develop a A$185 million logistics facility in Australia.

In January 2024, it was reported that for Phoenix's seventh opportunity fund, it removed mainland China from its strategy. Phoenix was responding to its investors' preference to avoid political risk associated with exposure to assets in China. However it was expected to not have a significant impact as China exposure had not exceeded 15% of the firm's AUM since 2010 and Phoenix had not invested in China for a while. In addition investors saw that there could be better risk adjusted returns from more developed markets in Asia such as Australia, Japan South Korea.
