= Tag Taylor =

British politician (1925–2014)

Sir (Arthur) Godfrey Taylor DL (usually known as Tag Taylor) (3 August 1925 - 31 May 2014) was a British local government leader best known for his work as Chairman of the London Residuary Body which disposed of the assets of the Greater London Council after its abolition.

Taylor was educated at Stockport Secondary School. He was first elected as a Conservative councillor to Sutton and Cheam Borough Council in 1951. In 1962 he was elected an Alderman, and he was elected for Cheam South ward to Sutton Borough Council from the creation of the council in 1964 until 1968. He was an Alderman of Sutton from 1968 until the abolition of the Aldermanic system in 1978. He then returned to his old ward for a final term from 1978 to 1982. Having previously served as Leader of Sutton Borough Council and Chairman of the London Boroughs Association (1968-1971), from 1978 to 1980 Taylor was Chairman of the Association of Metropolitan Authorities, ending his term with a knighthood.

The Conservative government appointed Taylor as Chairman of the Southern Water Authority in 1981 for a four-year term. As this term was coming to an end, he was picked to head up the London Residuary Body. His close connections with the Conservative Party were regarded with cynicism by opponents of the abolition of the GLC, which had been controlled by a left-wing Labour administration in its last five years. However, the LRB had very few powers beyond selling off and dismantling the GLC, and when he took charge he was not a prominent figure. The most controversial decision of the LRB, to sell off the GLC's offices at County Hall to a Japanese corporation rather than the London School of Economics, was taken when Taylor was very little known to the public.

Taylor was reappointed chairman several times. As the LRB progressively sold off assets, its work reduced and from 1 December 1992 his time commitment reduced from 5 days a week to one. He continued until the LRB had completed its work and was wound up in 1996. An academic study of its work, "The Dismantlers", gave general praise for the work it had done, but members of the old GLC regarded its purpose as being fundamentally destructive. Taylor became a Deputy Lieutenant of Greater London in 1988, and was Chairman of the Shrievalty Association from 1995 to 1998. He served as High Sheriff of Greater London in 1984.
