= BentallGreenOak =

Real estate investment firm

- Trade name: BGO
- Type: Subsidiary
- Industry: Private equity real estate
- Founded: July 1, 2019; 7 years ago
- Headquarters: Miami, U.S.
- Number of locations: 25 offices
- Key people: Sonny Kalsi (Co-CEO); John Carrafiell (Co-CEO); Amy Price (President)
- AUM: US $86 billion (March 31, 2025)
- Number of employees: 1,400 (2025)
- Parent: Sun Life Financial
- Website: www.bgo.com

BentallGreenOak (branded as BGO) is a real estate investment firm headquartered in Miami, U.S. The firm is the real estate subsidiary of Sun Life Financial. It is considered one of the largest real estate investment firms in North America.

Bentall Kennedy and GreenOak Real Estate merged to form BentallGreenOak in 2019. In 2022, the firm was ranked by PERE (under Private Equity International) as the seventh largest Private Equity Real Estate firm based on total fundraising over the most recent five-year period. In 2025, it rose to fourth place in the same ranking.

== History ==
Bentall Kennedy and GreenOak Real Estate merged to form BentallGreenOak in 2019.

Bentall Kennedy was a Canadian real estate investment firm that was a subsidiary of Sun Life Financial and GreenOak Real Estate was an American private equity real estate firm established in 2010 with its seed capital being provided by the Tetragon Financial Group.

In 2019, Sun Life Financial acquired a 56% stake in GreenOak Real Estate by paying $195 million in cash. Then Sun Life merged the two firms to form BentallGreenOak. Bentall Kennedy's CEO, Gary Whitelaw became CEO of the new entity.

In 2020, Whitelaw retired from his position as CEO and was replaced by GreenOak Real Estate co-founders, Sonny Kalsi and John Carrafiell, who are currently serving as co-CEOs.

In February 2023, it was reported that BGO has been building its US commercial real estate lending platform.

In September 2023, BGO introduced move-in-ready offices for SME tenants seeking flexibility in hybrid work arrangements.

In September 2024, BGO stated that while the commercial-property market had hit the bottom and would start to recover, the office sector would still have challenges due to a shift in tenant demand.

In May 2025, BGO raised $4.6 billion on its BGO Asia Fund IV targeting Japan making it the largest fund at that time. This came as a surprise to some as the firm was based in the US. It was suggested reasons included better returns and wanting to diversify beyond the US due to geopolitical factors.

== Investments ==
- 1250 René-Lévesque
- KPMG Tower
- North Hill Centre
- Richardson Building
- Sun Life Centre
- St. Vital Centre
- The Tenor
- Apple Campus 3

== Legal actions ==
East End Capital and a pair of Australian investors filed a lawsuit against BentallGreenOak after they pulled out from a deal to purchase a Miami office tower. The court ruled in favour of BentallGreenOak in 2021, resulting in East End Capital's side being required to pay back a $5.5 million deposit.
