= National Association of Real Estate Investment Trusts =

Washington, D.C.-based association

Coordinates: 38°54′55.6″N 77°2′30″W

- Abbreviation: Nareit
- Formation: September 15, 1960
- Headquarters: Washington, D.C.
- Location: United States
- Official language: English
- Key people: Steven A. Wechsler (President & CEO)
- Website: www.reit.com

The National Association of Real Estate Investment Trusts (Nareit) is a Washington, D.C.–based association representing industries that include real estate investment trusts (REITs), mortgage REITs (mREITs), REITs traded on major stock exchanges, public non-listed REITs, and private REITs. Nareit’s mission is to actively advocate for REIT-based real estate investment with policymakers and the global investment community. It also serves as a valuable resource for REIT policymakers.

Nareit’s members are REITs and other international independent businesses.^{[5]} It is run by an independent executive board^{[6]} led by President and CEO Steven A. Wechsler.^{[7]}

== History ==
On September 14, 1960, President Dwight D. Eisenhower signed legislation for a new approach to real estate investment. The following day, on September 15, 1960, the National Association of Real Estate was incorporated. This association gradually rebranded into Nareit, which has partnered with several other entities in its investor outreach endeavors, most notably the FTSE Group and the European Public Real Estate Association. They have established the FTSE EPRA / Nareit Global Real Estate Index Series.

== Publications ==
Nareit produces publications. Nareit’s website, reit.com, is the association’s primary communications tool. In addition, Nareit publishes a daily executive news summary (Real Estate Investment SmartBrief), several member newsletters, a weekly REIT Report podcast, and others. The Nareit organization compiles a group of indexes that are composed exclusively of publicly traded REITs. Among those topline indexes are:

- The FTSE Nareit All REITs Index – An index composed of all publicly traded REITS in relative marketing weightings. The index is available via real-time updates and is rebalanced on a monthly basis.
- FTSE Nareit Equity REIT Index – Has the same data as the Nareit Index, but this index excludes mortgage REITs.
- FTSE Nareit Mortgage REIT Index – An index of all publicly traded mortgage REITS.
