= GLP (company) =

Singaporean logistics provider

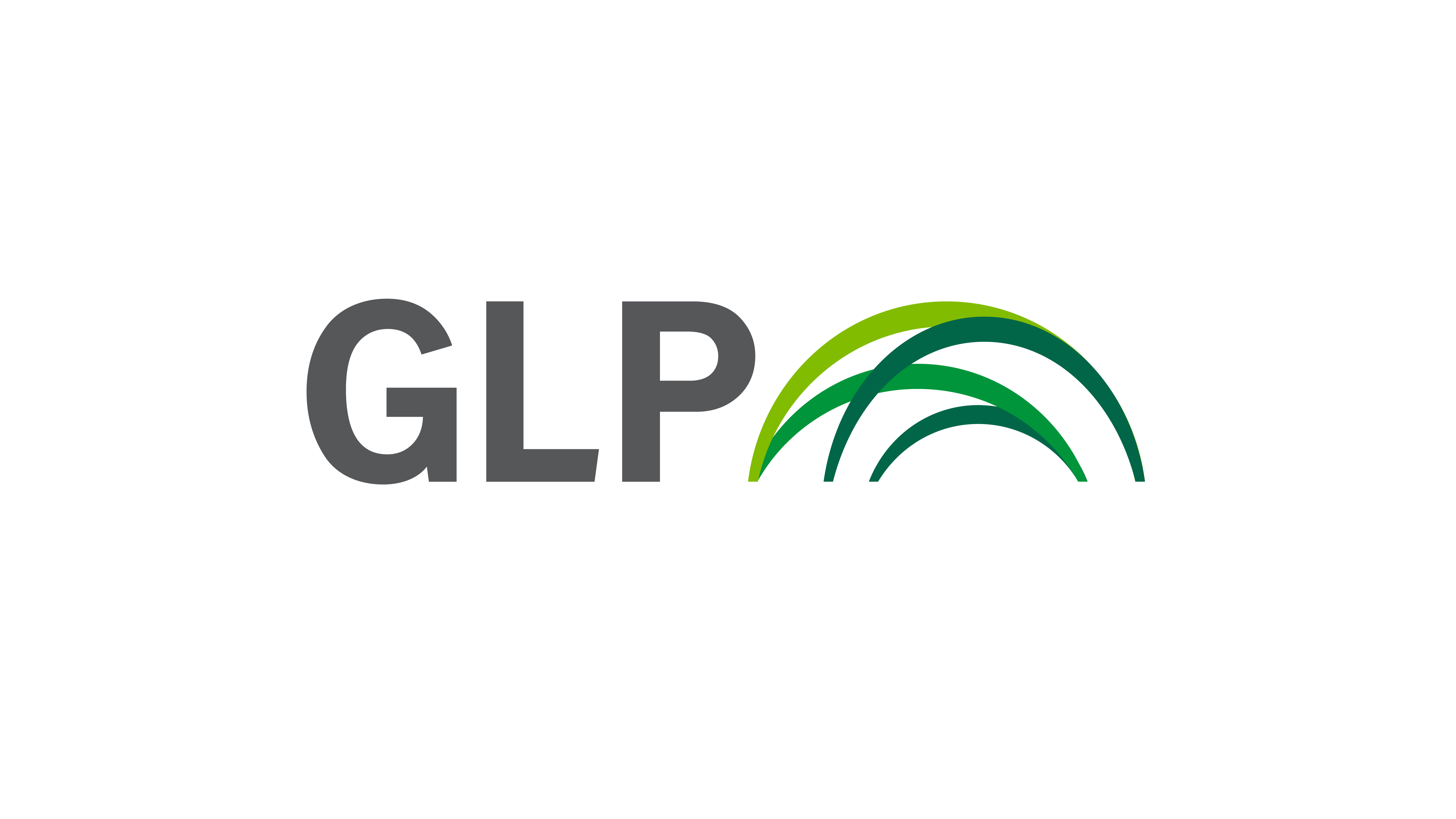
- Formerly: Global Logistic Properties
- Company type: Private
- Industry: Logistics, Digital Infrastructure, Renewable Energy
- Founded: 2009; 17 years ago (as Global Logistic Properties)
- Founders: Ming Z. Mei, Jeffrey H. Schwartz
- Area served: Brazil, China, Europe, India, Japan, Vietnam and the U.S.
- Key people: Ming Z. Mei (co-founder and CEO)
- Website: glp.com

GLP (formerly Global Logistic Properties) is a global owner, developer and operator of logistics real estate, digital infrastructure and renewable energy. GLP also invests in and incubates new businesses that improve efficiency and drive growth across its platforms. The company's warehouses serve logistics service providers, manufacturers, retailers and e-commerce companies such as Amazon and JD.com.

In 2010, GLP became a public company listed on the Singapore Exchange. It raised $2.7 billion in its initial public offering, making it Singapore's largest IPO since 1993. The company entered the US market in 2015 with the $8.1 billion acquisition of IndCor Properties Inc.’s warehouse portfolio and the purchase of 200 warehouses for $4.55 billion, making it the second-largest owner of industrial real estate in the U.S.

GLP went private and delisted from the Singapore Exchange in 2018. Its June 2019 sale of a network of U.S. warehouses to The Blackstone Group for $18.7 billion was the largest private real estate transaction in history.

As of March 2024, GLP manages more than 84 million square meters of real estate across China, Brazil, India, Japan, the U.S., Europe and Vietnam.

== History ==
=== Founding and early history ===
Incorporated in 2007 as Global Logistic Properties, it was subsequently listed on the Singapore Exchange in 2010 by co-founders Ming Mei and Jeffrey Howard Schwartz. Schwartz and Mei had both worked for American logistics real estate investment trust company Prologis; Schwartz was a chief executive and Mei launched the company's operations in China. When Schwartz stepped down from Prologis in November 2008, he and Mei partnered with Singapore's sovereign wealth fund GIC to purchase Prologis’ assets in China and Japan for $1.3 billion.

GLP was listed on the Singapore Exchange in October 2010, raising S$3.45 billion ($2.7 billion) in its initial public offering.

Through a joint venture with GIC, China Investment Corporation and CPP Investment Board, GLP expanded to Latin America in 2012 by purchasing over 30 logistics assets in Brazil for $1.45 billion. The same year it listed a $1.3 billion Japanese REIT on the Tokyo Stock Exchange; at the time it was Japan's largest real estate IPO.

On November 19, 2014, co-founder and deputy chairman Schwartz died at the age of 55.

After its 2015 U.S. acquisitions of IndCor Properties from The Blackstone Group for $8.1 billion and 200 U.S. warehouses for $4.55 billion, GLP continued to expand globally with the $2.8 billion acquisition of Gazeley, a company that owns warehouses and distribution parks throughout Europe and North America.

=== Privatization ===
In 2017 GLP put itself up for sale in a bid to go private. The auction for the company - initially valued at $10 billion - was subject to criticism after it only attracted two bidders - Warburg Pincus and a consortium that included Bank of China, China Life Insurance Company, Hopu Investment Management and GLP chief executive Mei. Several potential investors opted not to bid, saying the process lacked transparency and Mei's involvement gave the consortium an advantage. In July 2017, Mei's consortium won the bid to acquire GLP and take the company private for S$16 billion ($11.6 billion). More than 96 percent of the company's shareholders voted for GLP to delist from the Singapore Stock Exchange in November 2017; it was officially delisted on January 22, 2018.

=== History since 2018 ===
Global Logistic Properties changed its name to the acronym GLP in 2018 because its mission expanded. In spring of 2018, GLP established the $1.6 billion Hidden Hill Modern Logistics Private Equity Fund to invest in technology solutions such as robotics, automation and big-data sectors to improve efficiency in the logistics industry.

In September 2018, GLP expanded into India by forming a strategic partnership with IndoSpace.

GLP sold about 1,300 of its U.S. warehouses to The Blackstone Group in June 2019 for $18.7 billion. The Wall Street Journal called it "the largest private real-estate transaction ever."

On 11 October 2019, GLP announced that it would acquire 50% of China Merchants Capital from China Merchants Group.

In March 2020, GLP and Golden Lincoln Holdings offers $930 million to take consumer goods supplier Li & Fung private.

During the COVID-19 pandemic, the company opens 110 of its logistics parks in China for the storage and transfer of healthcare equipment.

In November 2024, it was reported that GLP was considering a listing on the Hong Kong Stock Exchange in 2025.
