= GPR index =

The GPR index, derived from Global Property Research, is a stock market index composed of property companies that trade on several global exchanges.

== See also ==
- EPRA index
