= Taxable REIT subsidiaries =

Taxable REIT subsidiaries (TRSs) allow real estate investment trusts (REITs) to more effectively compete with other real estate owners. They do this by providing services to tenants or third parties such as landscaping, cleaning, or concierge, and they provide new earnings growth opportunities.

== General overview ==
A Real estate investment trust (REIT) can be an organization or an establishment able to supply other investors to finance their real estate business in a tax-efficient manner. In order to become a REIT, the organization needs to be registered as a corporation, trust, or association; it needs to be run by one or numerous trustees or directors.

A taxable REIT subsidiary (TRS) is a directly or indirectly REIT-owned corporation that was cooperatively elected alongside the REIT to be managed as a TRS for tax reasons. The TRS was introduced in 1999 in order to give the REITs more flexibility; its main purpose is to execute orders and activities that can not be done by the REIT. One of the things the TRS can do for the REITs is to hold assets on their account, assets which can be acquired by the REIT itself. Aside from the former, TRS can be created by the REITs to manage service incomes like rents for use of real property, charges for services connected to rental real property, and rent related to personal property.

In order to become a TRS, a corporation should have stock owned directly or indirectly by a REIT. The application for TRS is done by the REIT and the corporation through Form 8875. The TRSs are usually organized as limited liability companies (LLC) per law hence it is dismissed for federal income taxation.

== United States ==
In the United States, the piece of legislation that enables "taxable REIT subsidiaries" to exist is the REIT modernization act (RMA), which became effective in 2001. The RMA allows REITs to own 100% of the stock of a TRS that can provide services to REIT tenants (and others) without disqualifying rents that the REIT receives from tenants.
