= Workspace Group =

UK real estate investment trust

Workspace Group plc
- Type: Public company
- Traded as: LSE: WKP; FTSE 250 component
- Industry: Property
- Founded: 1987
- Headquarters: London, United Kingdom
- Area served: Greater London
- Key people: Duncan Owen (Chairman); Charlie Green (CEO); Tom Edwards-Moss (CFO)
- Products: Commercial property for SMEs
- Revenue: ▼£181.4 million (2026)
- Operating income: ▼£(89.3) million (2026)
- Net income: ▼£(120.3) million (2026)
- Website: www.workspace.co.uk

Workspace Group plc is a real estate investment trust based in London, England. Founded in 1987 by the privatisation of property assets of the former Greater London Council, the company lets office, industrial and workshop space to small and medium-sized enterprises. It is listed on the London Stock Exchange and is a constituent of the FTSE 250 Index.

== History ==
The company was founded under the name London Industrial in 1987 as a vehicle for the disposal of the commercial property assets of the defunct Greater London Council. Financed by a group of twelve investors, the company acquired 18 properties from the London Residuary Body, which was charged with disposing the GLC's assets. The firm listed on the London Stock Exchange in 1993 with a market cap of around £813 million, and subsequently expanded geographically with the purchase of industrial estates in the West Midlands. The company changed its name to Workspace Group PLC in 1997.

The £80 million purchase of 23 London properties from Tonex in 1999 increased the Workspace portfolio by 40%, while the Midlands investments were sold off two years later as the group chose to concentrate on the capital region. Along with eight other major British property companies, Workspace converted to real estate investment trust status upon their introduction to the UK in January 2007.

In June 2026, Saba Capital Management demanded that the company sell off their portfolio of flexible offices.

== Portfolio ==
The portfolio, which comprises a (largely freehold) mix of office buildings, industrial estates, serviced offices and warehouses primarily for let to small and medium-sized enterprises, was valued at £2.1 billion as at 31 March 2026.
