= Morgan Properties =

Real estate investment and management company

- Type: Private
- Founded: 1985
- Founder: Mitchell Morgan
- Headquarters: Conshohocken, Pennsylvania (formerly King of Prussia, Pennsylvania)

Morgan Properties is an American real estate investment and property management company founded in 1985 and based in Conshohocken, Pennsylvania. It is one of the largest owners of multifamily housing in the United States, with a portfolio that includes over 350 apartment communities and more than 95,000 units across 19 states. The company is known for its family-led management style, emphasizing quick decision-making, operational expertise, and a commitment to community relationships.

Mitchell Morgan is the founder and current chief executive officer of the company.

== History ==
Morgan Properties was founded in 1985.

In 2007, alongside AIG Global Real Estate, Morgan Properties purchased nearly 17,500 apartments for around $2 billion from Kushner Companies.

In 2018, tenants in Maryland filed a lawsuit against Morgan Properties, alleging that the company charged residents illegal fees. The company has been the subject of lawsuits in Pennsylvania alleging it refused accommodation requests for disabled tenants, and in Maryland alleging that it allowed a bed bug infestation.

In 2019, the company purchased eighty apartment complexes from unrelated Morgan Communities, whose founder, Robert C. Morgan, has been charged with mortgage fraud.

In 2022, several law firms filed an antitrust class action lawsuit against RealPage and multiple of RealPage's property management clients, including Morgan Properties.
