= Hospital Infantil Sabará =

The Hospital Infantil Sabará (English: Sabará Children's Hospital) is a children's hospital located in Higienópolis, São Paulo, Brazil.
