= Michael Page (company) =

British-based recruitment business

Michael Page plc
- Type: Public
- Traded as: LSE: PAGE; FTSE 250 component
- Industry: Recruitment
- Founded: 1976
- Headquarters: Weybridge, Surrey, UK
- Key people: David Lowden, Chairman; Nick Kirk, CEO
- Revenue: ▼£1,596.6 million (2025)
- Operating income: ▼£20.9 million (2025)
- Net income: ▼£9.0 million (2025)
- Number of employees: 6,900 (2026)
- Website: www.michaelpage.co.uk

Michael Page plc, formerly PageGroup plc, is a British multinational recruitment business. It is headquartered in Weybridge, Surrey and is a constituent of the FTSE 250 Index.

== History ==
The company was formed in 1976 by Michael Page and Bill McGregor, who placed accountants into permanent positions in the United Kingdom. Initially, the pair worked in London, but by 1979 had opened offices in Manchester, Birmingham, Glasgow, Leeds and Bristol.

In 1985, an office was opened in Australia, and the organisation opened in France in 1986. The company was first listed on the Unlisted Securities Market as Michael Page International in 1983 and was admitted to the London Stock Exchange in 1988.

Michael Page retired in 1995, with Terry Benson appointed as Chief Executive in 1990. In 1997, the company was acquired by Spherion Corporation (formerly Interim Services Inc.).

The company was demerged from Spherion Corporation in 2001. In 2006, Terry Benson resigned, and Steve Ingham was appointed Chief Executive.

In October 2012, the company rebranded from Michael Page International to PageGroup.

In November 2016, PageGroup was hacked when a development server operated by Capgemini was attacked.

The company changed its name from PageGroup to Michael Page plc in July 2026.

== Operations ==
The company is a provider of permanent, contract and temporary recruitment for clerical professionals, qualified professionals and executives across various disciplines. The company has five operational brands: Michael Page, Page Executive, Page Personnel, Page Outsourcing and Page Contracting. The company operates in 36 countries globally.

As of August 2025, accountancy recruitment accounts for 40 per cent of the company's revenue.
