= DNE Group =

Chinese real estate investment firm

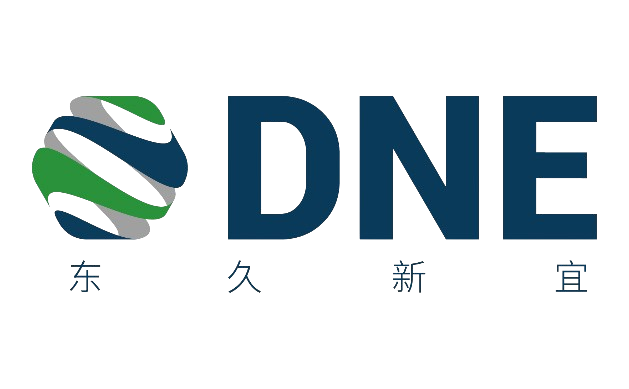
- Native name: 东久新宜
- Type: Private
- Industry: Investment management
- Founded: 16 December 2021; 4 years ago
- Founders: Sun Dongping
- Headquarters: Shanghai, China
- Key people: Sun Dongping (Chairman & CEO)
- Products: Infrastructure fund Real estate
- AUM: US$19 billion (2024)
- Owner: Warburg Pincus
- Number of employees: 300+ (2024)
- Website: www.dnegroup.com

DNE Group (DNE; Chinese: 东久新宜; pinyin: Dōngjiǔ Xīnyí) is a Chinese real estate investment firm.

The firm focuses on new economy infrastructure investments such as logistics centers, industrial parks and urban renewal.

== Background ==
In 2014, ESR Group co-founder Sun Dongping along with Warburg Pincus founded D&J. D&J focused on investments in industrial parks. Backers included Bain Capital who committed a $300 million investment in 2019.

In 2018, Sun and Warburg Pincus founded New Ease that focused on investments related to logistics. It would form joint ventures with JP Morgan Asset Management, Goldman Sachs Asset Management and QuadReal Property Group.

On 16 December 2021, D&J and New Ease completed a "strategic merger" to form DNE. Investors who backed the new entity included Partners Group, StepStone Group and Sequoia Capital.

On 14 October 2022, DNE listed its first REIT on the Shanghai Stock Exchange. The REIT worth $200 million gave investors an opportunity to tap into stable rental income from four industrial parks that DNE owned. It was China's first listed REIT sponsored by a private company.

On 24 October 2023, DNE and Bain Capital set up a $250 million industrial park joint venture in China. The aim was to provide high-quality modern manufacturing infrastructure initially in the Yangtze Delta region.

In May 2024, DNE and Shenwan Hongyuan established a 500 million yuan Pre-REIT related to industrial parks.

== See also ==
- ESR Group
- Warburg Pincus
