= London Residuary Body =

English organization

- Predecessor: Greater London Council
- Formation: August 12, 1985
- Founder: Local Government Act 1985
- Dissolved: March 29, 1996
- Region served: Greater London
- Chair: Godfrey Taylor (1985-1996)

The London Residuary Body was a body set up on 12 August 1985 to dispose of the assets of the Greater London Council (GLC) after the council's abolition in 1986.

== Governance ==
The LRB was chaired throughout its existence by Sir Godfrey Taylor, a Conservative who had previously been a leader of the Association of Metropolitan Authorities.

In 1986 Tony Banks had two adjournment debates on the LRB, which he said "exists in a vain attempt to clear up the appalling mess left in London following the Government's ill-conceived, ill-considered and ill-finished abolition of the Greater London council", and called "an unelected, unaccountable body whose members were hand-picked by the Government".

== Work ==
LRB plaque at London County Hall

Among the GLC assets disposed of by the LRB was County Hall and Parliament Hill Lido.

After the abolition of the Inner London Education Authority, the LRB took control of its assets.

After all of the assets were sold, the LRB was wound up in 1996, with any remaining functions, property, rights and liabilities given to the boroughs of Kensington and Chelsea (in relation to accounts) and Bromley (otherwise).

== Related legislation ==
=== Primary ===
Acts of Parliament

- "Local Government Act 1985". Part VII: Residuary Bodies.

Statutory Instruments

- Statutory Instrument 1985 No. 1263 The London Residuary Body (Appointed Day) Order 1985
- Statutory Instrument 1990 No. 419 The London Residuary Body (Transfer of Property etc) Order 1990
- Statutory Instrument 1991 No. 184 The Education (London Residuary Body) (Capital Money) Order 1991
- Statutory Instrument 1991 No. 490 The London Residuary Body (Transfer of Compensation Functions) Order 1991
- Statutory Instrument 1991 No. 497 The Education (London Residuary Body) (Property Transfer) Order 1991
- Statutory Instrument 1991 No. 964 The Education (London Residuary Body) (Property Transfer) (No. 2) Order 1991
- Statutory Instrument 1991 No. 1787 The Education (London Residuary Body) (Property Transfer) (No. 3) Order 1991
- Statutory Instrument 1991 No. 2778 The Education (London Residuary Body) (Property Transfer) (No. 4) Order 1991
- Statutory Instrument 1992 No. 331 The Education (London Residuary Body) (Transfer of Compensation Functions) Order 1992
- Statutory Instrument 1992 No. 437 The Education (London Residuary Body) (Transfer of Functions and Property) Order 1992
- Statutory Instrument 1992 No. 501 The Education (London Residuary Body) (Transfer of Loans) Order 1992
- Statutory Instrument 1992 No. 586 The Education (London Residuary Body) (Transitional and Supplementary Provisions) Order 1992
- Statutory Instrument 1992 No. 587 The Education (London Residuary Body) (Property Transfer) Order1992
- Statutory Instrument 1992 No. 2257 The Education (London Residuary Body) (Transfer of Functions and Property) (No. 2) Order 1992
- Statutory Instrument 1992 No. 3325 The London Residuary Body (Number of Members) Order 1992
- Statutory Instrument 1994 No. 580 The Education (London Residuary Body) (Transfer of Property etc.) Order 1994
- Statutory Instrument 1994 No. 3078 The Education (London Residuary Body) (Property Transfer) (Amendment) Order 1994
- Statutory Instrument 1994 No. 3104 The London Residuary Body (Pits at Stone) Order 1994
- Statutory Instrument 1994 No. 3105 The Education, (London Residuary Body) (Property Transfer) (Amendment) (No. 2) Order 1994
- Statutory Instrument 1995 No. 627 The Education (London Residuary Body) (Property Transfer) (Modification and Amendment) Order 1995
- Statutory Instrument 1995 No. 1202 The Education (London Residuary Body) (Property Transfer) (Modification and Amendment) (No. 2) Order 1995
- Statutory Instrument 1996 No. 557 The London Residuary Body (Winding Up) Order 1996
- Statutory Instrument 1996 No. 2082 The Education (London Residuary Body) (Property Transfer) (Amendment) Order 1996
- Statutory Instrument 1997 No. 1990 The Education (London Residuary Body) (Suspense Account Properties) Order 1997
- Statutory Instrument 1998 No. 723 The Education (London Residuary Body) (Property Transfer) (Modification and Amendment) Order 1998
- Statutory Instrument 1998 No. 1239 The Education (London Residuary Body) (Property Transfer) (Modification) Order 1998
- Statutory Instrument 2000 No. 2196 The Education (London Residuary Body) (Property Transfer) (Amendment) Order 2000
- Statutory Instrument 2001 No. 308 The Education (London Residuary Body) (Property Transfer) (Revocation) Order 2001
- Statutory Instrument 2002 No. 2003 Education (London Residuary Body) (Property Transfer) (Amendment) Order 2002
- Statutory Instrument 2002 No. 2760 Education (London Residuary Body) (Property Transfer) (Amendment No. 2) Order 2002
- Statutory Instrument 2005 No. 1542 The Education (London Residuary Body) (Property Transfer) (Amendment) Order 2005

== See also ==
- Governance of Greater London (1986–2000)
- Similar residuary bodies were set up for the metropolitan counties.
- Workspace Group, who took on 18 properties from the LRB.
