= Hui Xian REIT =

Real estate investment trust in Hong Kong

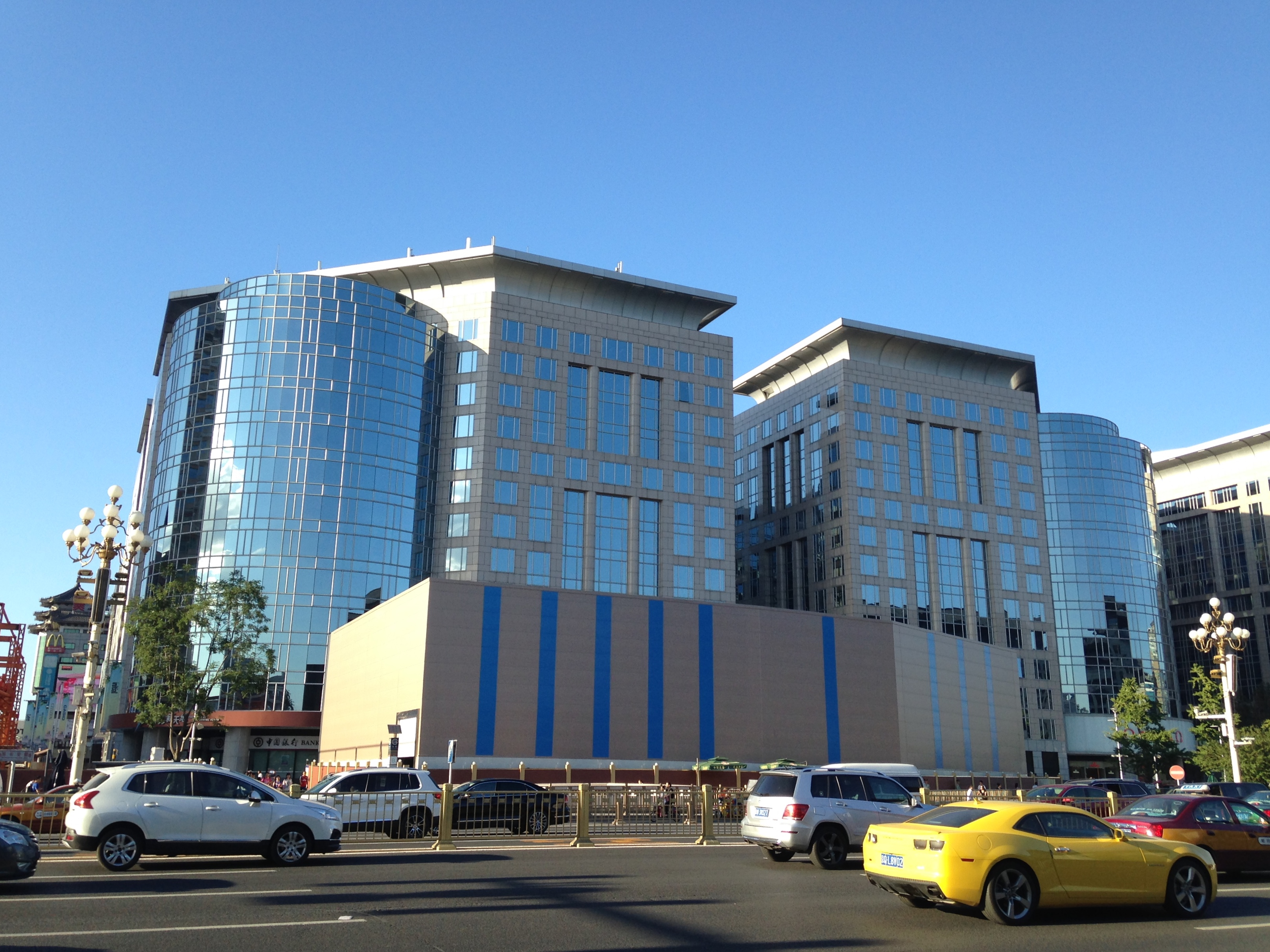
Oriental Plaza, Beijing

Hui Xian REIT (SEHK: 87001) is a real estate investment trust demerged from Cheung Kong Holdings. It is the first product listed on the Hong Kong Stock Exchange denominated in yuan. When it launched its IPO in 2011, its main asset is Oriental Plaza, a business park in Beijing.

In 2012, Hui Xian REIT had the second highest market capitalization among REITs in Hong Kong. As of 2019, its portfolio included shopping malls, office buildings, serviced apartments, and hotels.
