= European Public Real Estate Association =

Nonprofit trade group of property companies

The European Public Real Estate Association
- Company type: Real estate Association
- Industry: Real estate
- Founded: 1999
- Headquarters: Brussels, Belgium
- Key people: Pere Viñolas Serra (Chairman), Dominique Moerenhout (Chief Executive)
- Website: www.epra.com

The European Public Real Estate Association (EPRA), is a non-profit association representing Europe's publicly listed property companies. It is run by an independent Board of Directors chaired by Pere Viñolas Serra.

== History ==
From its formation in Amsterdam in 1999, partnering initially with Euronext and later with FTSE and NAREIT, the three bodies established the FTSE EPRA/NAREIT Global Index series which is now used as the global indices platform from which to benchmark the performance of stock exchange-quoted property companies and real estate investment trusts. The association has been located in Brussels since 2009.

== Activities ==
Raising the understanding of real estate in relation to investments and its role in society in general is a core activity for EPRA. Property company data and statistics derived from the indices form the basis of wide-ranging academic research on the listed sector (both commissioned by EPRA and independently conducted).

On a financial reporting level, EPRA's aim is to establish consistent reporting across the real estate sector. The Association encourages the adoption of an industry-wide set of financial reporting KPIs, and Gold, Silver, Bronze and Most Improved Best Practice Recommendations (BPR) Awards are delivered to companies based on the analysis of annual reports by auditor Deloitte.
