= Private equity real estate =

Term used in investment finance

Private equity real estate is a term used in investment finance to refer to a specific subset of the real estate investment asset class. Private equity real estate refers to one of the four quadrants of the real estate capital markets, which include private equity, private debt, public equity and public debt.

== Overview ==
Direct vs. Indirect Ownership of Real Property – Private equity real estate investing involves the acquisition, financing and direct ownership and holding of the title to an individual property or portfolios of properties, as well as the indirect ownership and holding of a securitized or other divided or undivided interest in a property or portfolio of properties through some form of pooled fund investment vehicle or arrangement. These typically can be structured as an individually managed (or separate) account, a commingled fund, real estate holding company, real estate holding corporation, actively managed real estate operating company or similar types of structures.

Types of Investors – Investors in private equity real estate (as well as investors in the other three quadrants of the real estate capital markets) include private accredited and non-accredited individual investors and institutional investors, as well as privately held and publicly traded real estate development, investment and operating companies. (Institutional investors include any organization that manages money professionally for the benefit of third parties.)

Individual Investors – Individual investors include fully accredited investors who meet the minimum income and net worth requirements established by the SEC, and non-accredited investors who do not meet those requirements. Both accredited and non-accredited investors participate in direct investments in real estate, either individually or through non-securitized partnerships. Both also typically invest in the public equity real estate markets, which includes the publicly traded, listed securities of public Real Estate Investment Trusts (REITs), as well as various securities issued by other forms of publicly traded real estate operating companies. Except for a few exemptions, illiquid, non-traded private real estate securities offerings typically are suitable only for fully accredited investors. Accredited investors typically include moderate to high net worth investors who can satisfy the suitability requirements of these offerings. Private placements of real estate securities are exempt from registration with the SEC, and issuers of these securities are prohibited from making a general solicitation for these offerings.

Institutional Investors – Institutional private equity real estate investors include pension funds (corporate, public and Taft-Hartley), endowments, foundations, family offices, sovereign wealth funds, insurance companies, publicly traded and listed Real Estate investment Trusts (REITs), non-listed private REITs, and other forms of public or private real estate operating companies, venture capital operating companies as well as other specialized types of investment companies. These professional investors either invest directly in real property with their own in-house professional investment staff or via one or more different kinds of advised investment arrangements, investment vehicles or products offerings specifically designed to meet the needs of institutional investors. These arrangements typically are organized, structured and managed by third party professional real estate investment management firms, for a fee.

Privately held Real Estate Development, Real Estate Investment and Real Estate Operating Companies – In addition, privately held real estate development, real estate investment and real estate operating companies also invest for their own account in the private equity real estate asset sub class.

Property Types – The most common property types are office (suburban, urban, garden and high rise), industrial (warehouse distribution, research and development, and flex office/industrial space), retail (shopping malls, neighborhood and community shopping centers and power centers), and multifamily (apartments - both garden and high rise). In addition, some private equity investors invest what they commonly refer to as niche property types, including hotels, student housing, seniors housing, self-storage, medical office buildings, single family residential homebuilding, single family residential for rent housing, manufacturing facilities, undeveloped land for any of the above use, vineyards, manufactured housing, specialized tree houses, as well as other niche type properties.

Vehicle Structures – Pooled fund investments can be structured as limited partnerships, limited liability corps, C-corps, S-corps, collective investment trusts, private real estate investment trusts, insurance company separate accounts, as well as a host of other legal structures. Funds organized to meet the needs of and attract the interest of tax-exempt investors typically are structured to satisfy the qualifications of Real Estate Operating Companies (REOCS) or Venture Capital Operating Companies (VCOCs).

== History and evolution ==
There is a long history of institutional investment in real estate through direct ownership of property, through individually managed separate accounts, and through pooled investment funds. Initially institutional real estate investments were in core real estate, however, market conditions in the early 1990s led to the emergence of value added and opportunistic funds which aimed to take advantage of falling property prices to acquire assets at significant discounts. Private equity real estate emerged as an independent asset class in the beginning of the 21st century and has experienced huge growth in recent years.

== Strategies ==
Private equity real estate funds generally follow core, core-plus, value added, or opportunistic strategies when making investments.

- Core: This is a low-leverage, low-risk/low-potential return strategy with predictable cash flows. The fund will generally invest in stable, fully leased, typically class A, single or multi-tenant properties within strong, diversified metropolitan areas, often in gateway cities. Leverage for core strategies typically lies in the 0% to 30% range.
- Core-plus: Core-plus often is confused with and/or mistaken for value added real estate investment strategies. The term "core plus" was originally defined as "core" plus leverage, or leveraged core. Leverage for core plus strategies typically lies in the 30% to 50% range. Core-plus investments have similar attributes to core investments, but with some opportunity for value enhancement.
- Value-added: This is a medium-to-high-risk/medium-to-high-return strategy. It involves buying land or under leased or mispositioned property, improving it in some way, and selling it at an opportune time for gain. Properties are considered value added when they exhibit management or operational problems, require physical improvement, and/or suffer from capital constraints. Value Added strategies typically are leveraged between 40% and 60%.
- Opportunistic: This is a high-risk/high-return strategy. The properties will require a high degree of enhancement. This strategy may also involve investments in development, raw land, and niche property sectors. Some opportunity funds also will invest in securitized or non-securitized public or private debt instruments, with the objective of privatizing, repackaging, restructuring and then selling off these interests. Investments are tactical, and may also include financial arbitrage strategies or strategies focused on unwinding or working out complex financial structures or large, improperly leveraged portfolios. Opportunistic strategies can employ leverage levels up to 60% or higher.

== Features ==
Considerations for investing in private equity real estate funds relative to other forms of investment include:

- Substantial entry minimums, with most funds requiring significant initial investment (usually upwards of $250,000 plus further investment for the first few years of the fund).
- Investments in pooled real estate investment vehicles are referred to as "illiquid" investments which usually are expected to earn a premium over traded securities, such as stocks and bonds. Once invested, it is very difficult to gain access to your money as it is locked-up in long-term investments which can last for up to twelve years or even longer. Distributions are made when available from cash flow and upon disposition, only as investments are converted to cash; investors typically have no right to demand that distribution or sales be made.
- Funds organized for individual investors typically require that subscription agreements be funded at the time the subscription agreement is signed. Funds organized for institutional investors typically require investors to commit capital to the fund, and draw down on those commitments gradually and incrementally over the investment period of the fund as each property for the fund is acquired. If a private equity real estate firm can't find suitable investment opportunities, it typically can not draw on the investors' commitments. If the manager is not able to find suitable properties during the investment period stated in the fund's offering circular, the manager of the fund almost always will be obligated to release any uncalled capital commitments at the expiration of the stated investment period. Given the risks associated with private equity real estate investments, an investor can lose all of its investment if the fund performs poorly.

For the above-mentioned reasons, private equity fund investments are only suitable for those individual or institutional investors who can afford to have their capital locked in for long periods of time and who are able to risk losing significant amounts of money. This is balanced by the potential benefits of annual returns, which can range between 6% and 8% for funds pursuing core investment strategies, between 8% and 10% for core plus strategies, between 8% and 14% for funds pursuing value added strategies, and between 18% and 20% (or higher) for funds pursuing opportunistic investment strategies. Investors in private equity real estate funds tend, therefore, to be institutional investors or high-net-worth individuals, and other accredited investors.

== Size of industry ==
The popularity of private equity real estate funds has grown since 2000 as an increasing number of investors commit more capital to the asset class.

Private equity real estate is a global asset class valued at more than $5.1 trillion in aggregate. As of 2025, roughly 47% of capital raised over the past 12 months was focused on the US and Canadian property markets, 22% focused on European property markets and 7% targeting Asia Pacific property markets, with 24% raised to invest in global or multiregional strategies.

== Secondary market ==
Pre-existing investor commitments to private equity real estate funds purchased trade in the secondary market. Private equity real estate funds may sell for opportunity or liquidity, among other reasons. Active secondary brokers are focused on the secondary markets for trading of syndicated shares, real estate funds and other alternative fund investments. The real estate secondary market has grown in recent years to an estimated $5.3 billion in 2013.

== See also ==
- List of real estate investment firms
- Real estate
- Real estate transaction
- Private equity
- Property Management
- Taxation of Private Equity and Hedge Funds
- Real estate investment trust
- Australian real estate investment trust
