= EPRA index =

Stock market index

The FTSE EPRA Global Real Estate Index is a stock market index series jointly managed by EPRA (Brussels), FTSE (UK) and NAREIT (US), composed of property company constituents that trade on several global exchanges.

Region weightings as of 2025
1. United States (57.0%)
2. Japan (9.00%)
3. UK (3.00%)
4. China (3.00%)
5. Others (28.0%)

The European Public Real Estate Association (EPRA), is a non-profit association representing Europe's publicly listed property companies. It is run by an independent management board chaired by Christophe Cuvillier, CEO of Unibail-Rodamco. EPRA's CEO is Dominique Moerenhout.

Decisions taken regarding a constituent's inclusion or exclusion from the various index categories of the FTSE EPRA/NAREIT Index series are taken by the index committee for that region, quarterly, on the last day of trading after hours. The decisions are strictly governed by the index ground rules.

== Total annual returns ==
Gross year-on-year return (%) for each calendar year
Year	EPRA Developed Index
2019	28.4
2020	-10
2021	27.2
2022	-25
2023	10.9
2024	-2.7
2025	10.7

== Constituents ==
The top 10 constituents as of 2025 are:

- Welltower Inc
- Prologis Inc
- Equinix Inc
- Digital Realty Trust Inc
- Simon Property Group Inc
- Realty Income Corp
- Public Storage
- Equity Residential
- Ventas Inc
- Goodman Group
