= List of public REITs in the United States =

All REITs all publicly traded in the United States.

== Notable REITs ==
The five largest REITs in the United States by market capitalization, as of January 2025, according to S&P Global, are: Prologis, Equinix, American Tower Corporation, Welltower, and Digital Realty.

The following chart lists notable publicly traded real estate investment trusts based in the United States The list does not include non-notable, privately listed, or unlisted, REITs.

Company Name	REIT Type	Ticker Symbol
Clear Channel Outdoor	Advertising	NYSE: CCO
Lamar Advertising Company	Advertising	Nasdaq: LAMR
Outfront Media	Advertising	NYSE: OUT
Aimco	Apartments	NYSE: AIV
Camden Property Trust	Apartments	NYSE: CPT
Essex Property Trust	Apartments	NYSE: ESS
Mid-America Apartment Communities	Apartments	NYSE: MAA
UDR, Inc.	Apartments	NYSE: UDR
Vivmark Residential	Apartments	NYSE: VMRK
Gaming and Leisure Properties	Casinos; lodging	NYSE: GLPI
Vici Properties	Casinos; lodging	NYSE: VICI
Digital Realty	Data Center	NYSE: DLR
Equinix	Data Center	Nasdaq: EQIX
Iron Mountain	Data Center	Nasdaq: IRM
Quality Technology Services	Data Center	NYSE: QTS
Alexander's	Diversified	NYSE: ALX
EPR Properties	Diversified	NYSE: EPR
JBG Smith	Diversified	NYSE: JBGS
Starwood Property Trust	Diversified	NYSE: STWD
STORE Capital	Diversified	NYSE: STOR
Vornado Realty Trust	Diversified	NYSE: VNO
W. P. Carey	Diversified	NYSE: WPC
Healthpeak Properties	Healthcare	NYSE: DOC
Medical Properties Trust	Healthcare	NYSE: MPW
Ventas	Healthcare	NYSE: VTR
Welltower	Healthcare	NYSE: WELL
Americold	Industrial	NYSE: COLD
Prologis	Industrial	NYSE: PLD
Host Hotels & Resorts	Lodging	NYSE: HST
InnSuites Hospitality	Lodging	NYSE: IHT
Park Hotels & Resorts	Lodging	NYSE: PK
Xenia Hotels & Resorts	Lodging	NYSE: XHR
Sun Communities	Manufactured Housing	NYSE: SUI
UMH Properties	Manufactured Housing	NYSE: UMH
Annaly Capital Management	Mortgage	NYSE: NLY
Arlington Asset Investment	Mortgage	NYSE: AI
Alexandria Real Estate Equities	Office	NYSE: ARE
BXP, Inc.	Office	NYSE: BXP
Brandywine Realty Trust	Office	NYSE: BDN
COPT Defense Properties	Office	NYSE: CDP
Cousins Properties	Office	NYSE: CUZ
Hudson Pacific Properties	Office	NYSE: HPP
SL Green Realty	Office	NYSE: SLG
CoreCivic	Private prisons	NYSE: CXW
GEO Group	Private prisons	NYSE: GEO
CBL Properties	Regional Malls	NYSE: CBL
Macerich	Regional Malls	NYSE: MAC
Simon Property Group	Regional Malls	NYSE: SPG
CubeSmart	Self-Storage	NYSE: CUBE
Extra Space Storage	Self-Storage	NYSE: EXR
Public Storage	Self-Storage	NYSE: PSA
Brixmor Property Group	Shopping Centers	NYSE: BRX
Federal Realty Investment Trust	Shopping Centers	NYSE: FRT
InvenTrust Properties	Shopping Centers	NYSE: IVT
Kimco Realty	Shopping Centers	NYSE: KIM
Regency Centers	Shopping Centers	Nasdaq: REG
SITE Centers	Shopping Centers	NYSE: SITC
Tanger Factory Outlet Centers	Shopping Centers	NYSE: SKT
National Retail Properties	Single Tenant/NNN	NYSE: NNN
Realty Income Corporation	Single Tenant/NNN	NYSE: O
American Homes 4 Rent	Single-Family Houses	NYSE: AMH
Invitation Homes	Single-Family Houses	NYSE: INVH
American Tower	Telecommunications	NYSE: AMT
Crown Castle	Telecommunications	NYSE: CCI
SBA Communications	Telecommunications	Nasdaq: SBAC
PotlatchDeltic	Timber	NYSE: PCH
Rayonier	Timber	NYSE: RYN
Weyerhaeuser	Timber	NYSE: WY
