= List of companies operating nursing homes =

The following is a list of companies operating nursing homes in the U.S.:

- Association of Jewish Aging Services
- Bailey-Boushay House
- Brookdale Senior Living
- Catholic Health Services
- Ecumen
- Emeritus Assisted Living
- The Evangelical Lutheran Good Samaritan Society
- Genesis HealthCare
- Gentiva Health Services
- H/2 Capital Partners
- HCR ManorCare
- Humana
- Life Care Centers of America
- Lillian Booth Actors Home
- Lorien Health Services
- Motion Picture & Television Country House and Hospital
- St. Camillus Health Center
- Twelve Oaks Lodge
- Veterans Health Administration
- Wesley Woods
