= Granger Cobb =

American corporate executive

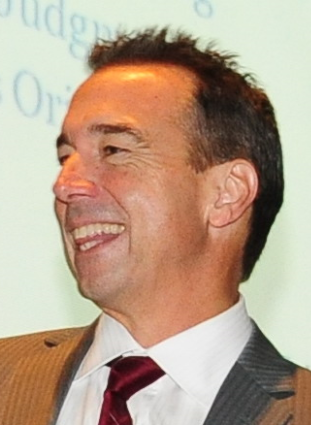
- Granger Cobb, c. 2012
- Born: Lewis Granger Cobb; July 29, 1960; Fort Ord, California, U.S.
- Died: September 22, 2015 (aged 55); Seattle, Washington, U.S.
- Education: University of California at Los Angeles
- Occupation: Chief Executive Officer
- Years active: 1989–2015
- Employer: Emeritus Senior Living
- Known for: caring for senior citizens by pioneering modern retirement communities
- Spouse: Tina (m. 1984)

Granger Cobb was an American retirement community executive who built the largest assisted living company in the United States. From one retirement community and through four large mergers and acquisitions, Cobb became the president and chief executive officer of Emeritus Senior Living with 521 retirement communities employing 31,000 people nationwide. He served in that role until Emeritus was acquired by Brookdale Senior Living on July 30, 2014. Cobb became a member of the board of directors of Brookdale.

== Early life ==
Granger Cobb was born Lewis Granger Cobb on July 29, 1960, near Fort Ord, California, to E. Lewis and Letty Cobb. His father Lew was stationed at Fort Ord for military service and the family moved to Madison, Wisconsin, in 1963, where Lew entered medical school. Granger was joined by two sisters, Melissa and Catherine. Upon receiving his medical degree Lew, Letty, Granger, Melissa, and Catherine moved to French Camp, California, where Lew did his residency and the family added two children, Bryson and Melanie. In 1971 the family moved to Morada, California, and lived there as Lew operated his OB/GYN medical practice.

His family lived near his maternal grandparents, to which Cobb attributed his early interest working with seniors. He went to UCLA and graduated with a degree in psychobiology. While at UCLA he worked as a broiler scrubber and waited tables at the Chart House in Westwood, Los Angeles, where he met his future wife Tina.

== Career ==
=== Cobbco ===
Granger Cobb began his senior living career working for his father-in-law Edward Keh as an executive director at a senior living community. In 1989, he and his wife Tina sold their personal home and cashed in her teacher pension to finance their first senior living community. This single community was the basis for Cobbco Incorporated.

=== Summerville, Sunwest, and Emeritus on the New York Stock Exchange ===
Summerville Senior Living acquired Cobbco in 1998, with Cobb joining the larger company. In 2000, he became president and CEO of Summerville and a member of the board of directors. Summerville merged with Emeritus Senior Living in 2007 where he was named president and co-CEO with Dan Baty. Emeritus acquired 144 communities from Sunwest in 2010. Speaking of the acquisition, Cobb said "Sunwest grew rapidly and really did not have a strong infrastructure for operational oversight. We have systems to monitor resident-care plans and to make sure we are charging for the level of care we are providing."

In 2011, Cobb became president and the sole CEO as the company continued to grow from 289 communities to over 500. Emeritus was listed on the New York Stock Exchange NYSE:ESC.

=== Brookdale acquisition and PBS Frontline ===
As change continued in the senior living industry, Emeritus considered its alternative futures. Merger explorations began in earnest in 2013 and culminated with a Brookdale Senior Living $2.8 billion deal announcement on February 20, 2014. During the course of the merger activities, Brookdale was questioned about Emeritus issues raised in a PBS Frontline story in 2013 and found Emeritus responded appropriately. Speaking to Forbes Cobb said:

We are 27,000 human beings caring for 40,000 residents and human beings make mistakes. We devote as much time and attention to training and orienting and giving guidance and making sure that they feel comfortable in the decisions that they make, but on occasion there will be mistakes.

As part of the terms of the acquisition, Cobb became a member of the board of directors at Brookdale, bringing his people, leadership, and operational expertise to the board.

== Industry organizations ==
While leading these companies, Cobb also served many industry organizations including as member of the board of directors of the National Investment Center for Seniors Housing & Care, the American Seniors Housing Association, the Assisted Living Federation of America, and the California Assisted Living Association.

== Leadership style ==
Cobb's tenure in each company was focused on both employees and customers, the senior residents and their families. The official Emeritus Senior Living tagline was not only used in advertising but was used to guide company operations: "Our family is committed to yours." When challenges arose during the development of the controversial PBS Frontline television program on senior living, Cobb agreed to appear on camera to discuss issues in retirement communities. Speaking to PBS, Cobb said:

We don’t make widgets, and so one of the things I would liken it to is if you are making a widget and you figure out how to shave a little quality off when nobody notices, you might be the hero. In our business, you shave any quality off and you’re going to see your reputation go down very quickly, and you’re going to see your bottom line go down very quickly. It’s just the opposite if we do a good job. We rely on our reputation.

Cobb led the final major growth spurt for Emeritus by taking over the operations of 38 communities from Merrill Gardens in California, Washington, and six other states.

In his 2012 court testimony, Cobb described his duties as primarily dealing with two areas: building infrastructure for operations, financial and regulatory components; and "looking out" for "three months, one year, three years, five years to help develop the strategic direction for the company"

== Washington State University ==
Cobb worked to expand the professional operations of retirement communities through industry organizations and by personally teaching at Washington State University, in a course for Senior Living Management in the WSU Carson College of Business, School of Hospitality Business Management.

The senior living curriculum is expanding continuously with the inception of the Granger Cobb Institute for Senior Living, described below.

== Death ==
Granger Cobb died of cancer on September 22, 2015, at his home in Seattle, Washington, US.

In recognizing Cobb's contributions, Andy Smith, Brookdale Senior Living's CEO, said, "Granger Cobb was a true pioneer and leader in our industry. He had a tremendous impact on the lives of countless seniors and their families and all who benefited from his leadership and vision."

== Legacy ==
The senior living trade association Argentum presents an annual award of the Cobb Cup, or fully the Granger Cobb Cup for Excellence in Political Action, named in honor Granger Cobb for, according to Argentum, "his longtime dedication to advocating on behalf of our industry and the residents that we serve". The award recognizes the yearly top contributor to their political action committee.

The Granger Cobb Institute for Senior Living was announced at the Argentum Senior Living Executive Conference in Nashville on May 4, 2017, by Bill Pettit, president-emeritus of R.D. Merrill, and Chris Hyatt, partner, investor, and president of New Perspective Senior Living. The institute follows Granger Cobb's passion to serve senior citizens by focusing on a transdisciplinary integrated approach to senior living operations, including hospitality, psychology, nursing, computer science, food science, human development, and entrepreneurship. It combines broad industry participation with academic rigor and has campus-based baccalaureate major and minor programs as well as an online educational program.

In 2025, the Institute was renamed Granger Cobb Institute for the Business of Aging - Carson College of Business | Washington State University
