= Stewart W. Bainum =

Stewart W. Bainum may refer to:

- Stewart W. Bainum Jr. (born 1946), American businessman and politician
- Stewart W. Bainum Sr. (1919–2014), American businessman and philanthropist
