= Bainum =

Bainum may refer to:

== People with the surname ==
- Duke Bainum (1952–2009), American politician
- Stewart W. Bainum, Sr. (1919-2014), American businessman and philanthropist
- Stewart W. Bainum, Jr. (born 1946), American businessman and philanthropist
