= Takoma Academy =

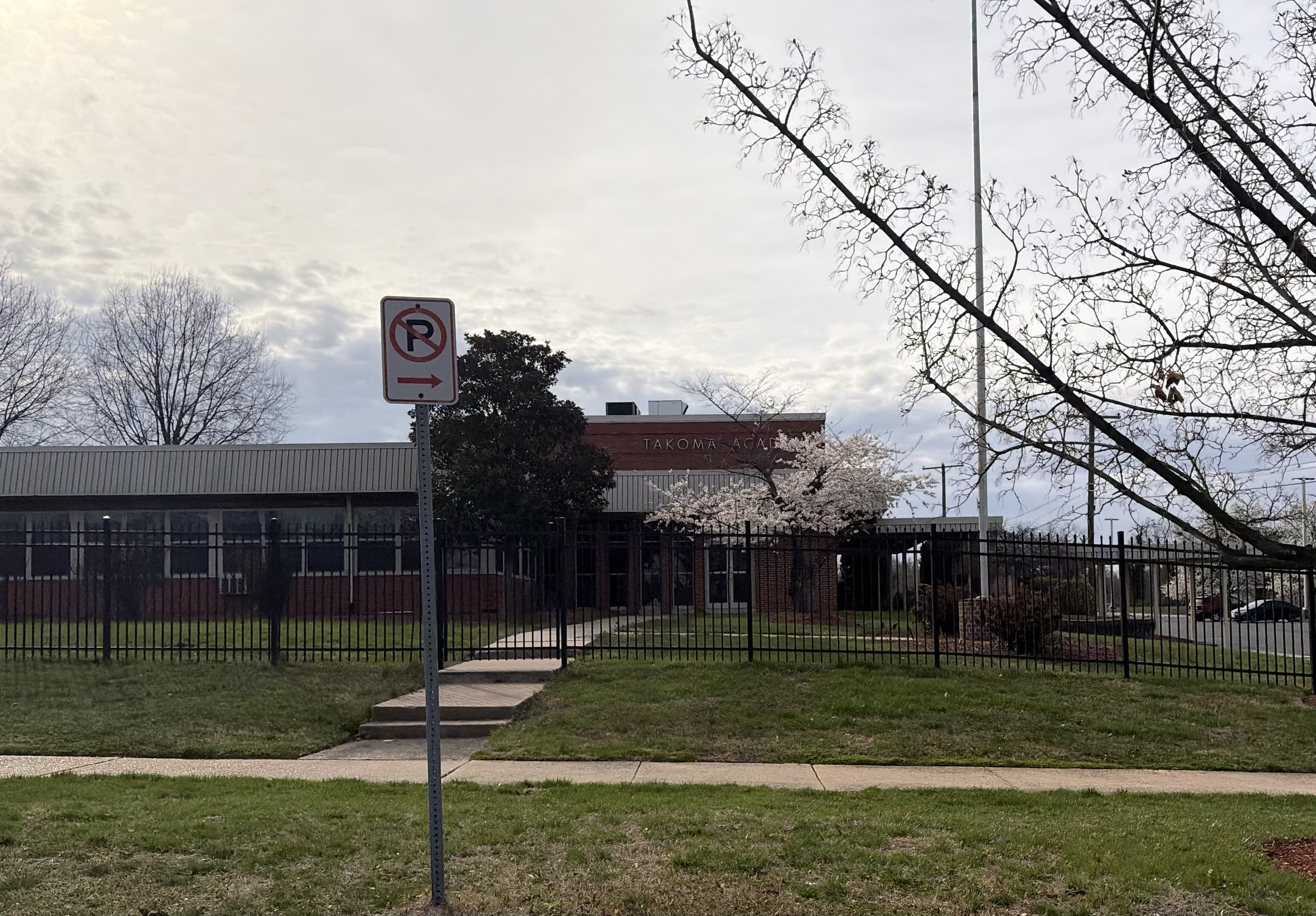
- Takoma Academy in 2026

Location
- Takoma Park, MD; USA; 38°59′31″N 76°59′38″W

Information
- Type: Private, 9-12 College Preparatory
- Established: 1904
- Principal: Jasmine Brann
- Faculty: 26
- Enrollment: approx. 227
- Color: Maroon White
- Athletics: Basketball, Volleyball, Track, Soccer, Football
- Mascot: Tigers
- Accreditation: Middle States Association of Colleges and Secondary Schools, Maryland State Board of Education, and Board of Regents, Office of Education, General Conference of Seventh-day Adventists
- Newspaper: Paw Prints
- Yearbook: The Takoman
- Website: www.ta.edu

Takoma Academy is a parochial, co-educational high school located in Takoma Park, Maryland operated by the Potomac Conference of Seventh-day Adventists. It is a part of the Seventh-day Adventist education system, the world's second largest Christian school system.

== History ==
Takoma Academy began in 1904 as part of the Washington Training Institute (now Washington Adventist University. It became an independent institute in 1932 and moved to its current location in 1952. Takoma Academy, formerly housed on the college campus, has been transferred to a separate campus and provided with a new modern building with capacity for more than three hundred students. Educational Progress in North American Division. J.P. Laurence was principal from 1947 to 1980 and led the school to accreditation by the Middle States Association of Colleges and Secondary Schools.

== Notable alumni ==
- Leonard Bailey - transplant surgeon
- Stewart W. Bainum Jr. - chairman and CEO of Manor Care, Inc. and Choice Hotels International; former Maryland State Delegate
- Tamir Goodman - basketball player
- Naji Marshall - NBA basketball player for the New Orleans Pelicans. Attended one year.
- Carlo Sanchez - Maryland State Delegate
- Tony Skinn - basketball player and coach
- Ted Wilson - President of the General Conference of Seventh-day Adventists

== See also ==
- List of Seventh-day Adventist secondary schools
- Seventh-day Adventist education
