= Association of Jewish Aging Services =

Umbrella organization

The Association of Jewish Aging Services (AJAS) was founded in 1960 as the North American Association of Jewish Homes and Housing for the Aging (NAJHHA). It was created and continues to function as the central coordinator for homes and residential facilities for Jewish elderly in North America. Dr. Herbert Shore was the driving force behind the establishment of AJAS and was the organization's first president and its founding executive vice president.

AJAS members organizations administer to the needs of the aging through residential health care; assisted living and group homes; independent and congregate housing; and living-at-home service programs. It promotes the unique role and mission of Jewish-sponsored not-for-profit organizations serving the aging by arranging educational meetings for the mutual exchange of information and ideas, and promotes advocacy for all elderly.

== Overview ==
AJAS is a non-profit that promotes and supports elder services in the context of Jewish values through education, professional development, advocacy and community relationships. It is governed by a voluntary board of directors, representing Jewish aging services organizations throughout North America. Professional staff manage day-to-day operations at the Washington, D.C., office.

== Membership programs ==
The AJAS membership consists of over 125 organizations: Jewish-sponsored nursing homes, housing communities, and outreach programs throughout the United States, Canada and Australia. They help Jewish elderly stay in their homes and communities of choice and live with dignity and adequate support. Donations support regional and local Jewish centers for applied research, advocacy and resource development. Member organizations serve nearly 1.5 million elderly Jews.

== Education and programs ==
In its continued effort to provide turn-key information to its membership, AJAS hosts a number of education events each year. These programs include:

- AJAS Annual Conference – provides a forum for the exchange of information and ideas. It is also an opportunity to give recognition to small programs that can be replicated; annual awards are announced.
- Regional Forums – AJAS Regional Forums are one-day gatherings hosted by member organizations that provide an opportunity for other members to come together with local colleagues to focus on hot industry topics. The Forums contain both structured presentations, plenty of time for networking and a site tour of the host facility.
- Webinars – AJAS hosts several 1-hour web-conferences each year to give members from across the United States and Canada an interactive forum to share programs, best practices and innovations from their own organizations with a large audience.

== Publications ==
- Journal on Jewish Aging - The goal of the Journal on Jewish Aging is to present AJAS and interested community members with practical and operational information unique to Jewish aging services. The subject matter includes, but is not limited to, the social, clinical or spiritual needs specific to the aging Jewish population and the management and governance of various types of Jewish senior service agencies. The Journal on Jewish Aging is a peer-reviewed publication.
- The Scribe - The Scribe is a quarterly magazine, published by AJAS, which features articles on turn-key activities at AJAS member organizations; intriguing staff and fascinating residents; AJAS events and publications; and other information pertinent to the field of Jewish aging services. Each Winter, AJAS published a supplement about building projects planned or underway at AJAS member organizations.

== Notable residents ==
- Nat Holman (1896–1995), Hall of Fame basketball player and coach

== Controversy ==
They fired their president/CEO when, for medical reasons, she wanted to work from home for a number of months following a serious surgery.
