= Ecumen =

- Type: Nonprofit organization
- Industry: Senior housing and services
- Genre: Senior housing and senior services
- Founded: Red Wing, Minnesota, 1862
- Founder: Lutheran Church
- Headquarters: Shoreview, Minnesota, United States
- Number of locations: 43 (2010)
- Area served: National
- Key people: Shelley Kendrick, President and CEO; Brett Anderson, SVP Chief Ecosystem and Operations Officer; Mel Sullivan, SVP Chief People Officer; Mo Alam, SVP of Administration & CFO
- Services: Assisted living, memory care, long-term care, home care, at-home services, senior housing development
- Revenue: $125.8 million (2009)
- Operating income: $937,000 (2009)
- Net income: $3.8 million (2009)
- Total assets: $246 million (2009)
- Total equity: $37 million
- Number of employees: 3,600 (2009)
- Divisions: Housing and Services Operations and Management, Senior Housing Development
- Website: ecumen.org

Ecumen is one of the United States' largest and oldest non-profit senior housing and services companies. Affiliated with the Evangelical Lutheran Church in America (ELCA), Ecumen was founded in 1862 and is headquartered in Shoreview, Minnesota. It is governed by a 17-member board of trustees, and its president and CEO is Kathryn Roberts. Shelley Kendrick has been named Ecumen’s incoming President and CEO, effective Feb. 4. Currently Ecumen’s SVP of Operations and COO, Shelley succeeds Kathryn Roberts, who has led the organization since 2003. Kathryn will continue to serve as CEO Emeritus, leading Ecumen Philanthropy.

Ecumen operates more than 70 senior housing and long-term care centers in Minnesota, Wisconsin, North Dakota and Idaho. This includes approximately 4,000 housing and care center units. Ecumen’s housing and service options include independent living, at-home residential services and home care, adult day services, assisted living housing, hospice, memory care housing and nursing homes that provide long-term care and short-term rehabilitative services.

In addition to direct-to-consumer services, Ecumen provides national senior housing development services, clinical consulting and management services to third parties.

Ecumen has more than 12,000 customers and employs approximately 4,000 people. Its 2009 revenues were $125.8 million. Ecumen was named ten for straight years (2004 to 2014) as one of Minnesota's "Best Places to Work" by the Minneapolis/St. Paul Business Journal.

== History ==
Ecumen began as a Lutheran social services agency in 1862, providing foster care services to children orphaned in the Dakota Conflict. By the early 20th century had it become a full-time operator of senior housing and services in Minnesota.

The company has been known under several different names throughout its history. In 1876 it became the Board of the Society of Mercy. In 1923 it became the Board of Christian Service, and 1962 it was named the Board of Social Ministry. Finally, in 2004 it became Ecumen, from the Greek word oikos, meaning "home".

In 2003, Kathryn Roberts, who had formerly been the executive director of the Minnesota Zoo, was named president and CEO. Due to America's demographic shift, Roberts has directed Ecumen's growth, including expansion of residential housing and services outside of Minnesota to Wisconsin, North Dakota and Idaho, as well as the launch of a senior housing development division that operates nationally. Ecumen has also moved into new services, including digital health technology and specialized residential housing and services to serve people who deal with behavioral challenges caused by Alzheimer's disease and dementia.
