= Talmudical Academy of Baltimore =

Jewish school in Maryland, United States

Coordinates: 39.3677°N 76.7473°W

- United States

Information
- Established: 1917
- Founder: Rav Avraham Nachman Schwartz

The Talmudical Academy of Baltimore or TA (Hebrew: ישיבת חפץ חיים) is a K–12 yeshiva founded in 1917. Its present campus, located at 4445 Old Court Road, includes a pre-school building, an elementary school building, a middle school building, a high school building, three gymnasiums, a dormitory, two computer labs, and two study halls which double as prayer sanctuaries.

== History ==
Talmudical Academy of Baltimore (TA) was founded in 1917 as Baltimore Parochial Hebrew School by Rav Avraham Nachman Schwartz. The first enrolled student was Rabbi Dr. Zalman Naftali Skaist (born 1911), who was to become a noted pioneer in American Jewish education. TA was located on Cottage Avenue until a fire caused by one of the custodians destroyed the building. The yeshiva then moved to its present location on Old Court. In 2018, the school completed a $22 million campus expansion which included an Early Childhood center and a new high school building, which included a gym, classrooms and beis medrash (study hall/prayer sanctuary). The rosh yeshiva (dean) is Yosef Rottenberg and the mesivta mashgiach is Rav Shraga Hershkowitz.

== Curriculum ==
=== Secular ===
The Elementary and Middle School curricula include all the basic secular studies: English, Math, Social Studies and Science. The High School curriculum includes Algebra (1&2), Geometry, Pre-Calculus, Environmental Science, Biology, Chemistry, Physics, World History, American History, English, and Jewish History (1&2). Advanced Placement courses that TA offers, include Physics, American History, European History, and English Literature. Seniors may optionally take college courses for English 101 and Psychology 101 provided by Baltimore City Community Community College (BCCC).

=== Religious ===
Talmud study begins in 5th grade at an introductory level. Talmudic study in earnest begins in 8th grade with its division into Bekius and Iyyun. Tractates that are studied with the Bekius method include Rosh Hashanah, Sotah, Ta'anit, Megillah, Chagigah, Succah, Brachos and others. Shorter tractates are usually chosen as Bekius tractates. The mesivta has a five-year cycle of Biyun mesechtos to finish. The five year time period ensures that the same tractates are not studied by the same students. The bekius tractates are chosen by the rabbi of the class, and unless circumstances force otherwise, that rabbi will learn the same tractates every year. Mishna is studied until 5th grade when the primary focus becomes Talmudic studies. The learning of Tanach is encouraged by most rabbis on the faculty, though it is not a primary subject after the fifth grade. Most set aside time in the morning for the study of halakha (Jewish law), however in most classrooms this is not a main focus of time and effort.

== Beis medrash ==
Until 1998, a beis medrash-level shiur was given by Rabbi Yosef Rottenberg. When he became too ill to continue giving the shiur, the beis medrash was discontinued. At the end of 2004, Rabbi Yisrael Asia was brought in to lead the beis medrash, which he did for the 2004–05 and 2005–06 school years. During the 2005/06 year, Rabbi Avrohom Notis also gave shiur to the beis medrash. In 2006–07, the beis medrash was resurrected yet again by Rabbi Bentzion Mellman and Rabbi Dovid Hoffman. Mellman acted as rosh beis medrash and instructor of Iyyun (a slower, in-depth Talmudic analysis) and Hoffman as the "Sho'el u-Maishiv" (study-hall mentor) and instructor of B'kius (a faster, less in-depth method of Talmudic study). The inaugural class consisted of seven members; however three more students joined the program in the middle of the year. The program continued through the 2008–09 year, but has been discontinued.

== Extra-curricular activities ==
TA used to have a varsity basketball team called the Fighting Davids in the '70s and '80s. In the '90s they became the Tigers. The team reached its zenith in the Tamir Goodman era, which was in the late '90s and early 2000s. The team name was then changed to the "Thunder".

Torah Youth Association (TYA) is loosely connected with TA. The Association, headed by Gavi Cohn, serves as an outlet for teenage boys to play sports and hang out in an environment that is acceptable for Orthodox Jewish groups. The TYA sponsors a flag football league based in a public park near TA, and tennis and pizza nights on Motzei Shabbos, as well as an annual Super Bowl party. TYA also hosted shabbatons at the Pearlstone Center in Western Maryland, as well as Camp Shoresh.

A Mishmar program for 6th, 7th, and 8th grade students takes place on most Thursdays, in which additional hours of Talmudic study occur. After the learning the 6th and 7th graders have a raffle and pizza is served. The 8th graders begin and end much later than the other students and have a basketball league afterwards followed by cholent.

TA sponsors many informal sports and other leisurely activities, such as the (now defunct) chess club, debate club, and the 'tag club' of the mid-1990s. TA also sponsors scholarly and religious programs for students and Jewish residents in the community, such as the small kollel they ran (which recently closed). There was a short-lived varsity baseball team, led by Paul Blitz, a U.S. Army Reserve soldier. In the late 1970s, National Football League player Mike Collier briefly served as gym teacher.

== Notable visitors ==
TA has hosted several famous roshei yeshiva (deans) and other scholars of repute. The list includes Rav Aharon Leib Shteinman, Rabbi Mendel Blachman (Ra"m at Yeshivat Kerem B'Yavneh), Rav Aharon Feldman, rosh yeshiva of Ner Yisroel, Rabbi Yechezkel Yaakovson, rosh yeshiva of Yeshivat Sha'alvim, Rav Shmuel Kamenetsky (Talmudical Yeshiva of Philadelphia), Rav Aharon Lopiansky (Yeshiva of Silver Spring), Rabbi Daniel Mechanic (Aish-Discovery), Rav Reuven Feinstein, Rabbi Zelig Pliskin, Rabbi Yehuda Peretz, Yerachmiel Millstein, Rabbi Noach Orlowek (mashgiach ruchani Yeshivas Torah Ore), Rav Aaron Schechter, and Rabbi Asher Zelig Rubinstein (rosh yeshiva of Yeshivas Toras Simcha).

== Notable alumni ==
- Aharon Feldman, rosh yeshiva Ner Israel Rabbinical College
- Mordechai Gifter, rosh yeshiva Telshe Yeshiva
- Tamir Goodman, basketball player
- Avigdor Miller, rabbi and author
- Yisroel Neuman, rosh yeshiva at Beth Medrash Govoha
- Zelig Pliskin, rabbi and author
