= Assisted Living Federation of America =

American trade association

The Assisted Living Federation of America (ALFA) is a trade association of senior living providers that manage assisted living communities across the United States. ALFA was formed in 1990. It is headquartered in Alexandria, Virginia, and has 30 affiliates and four chapters representing 34 states. ALFA is the largest national association exclusively dedicated to professionally managed, resident-centered senior living communities and the seniors and families they serve.

== Awards programs ==
The Best of the Best Awards - is an annual awards program that recognizes senior living providers who demonstrative innovative, unique and evolutionary approaches to improving quality of life for seniors and their families and those who work in senior living communities. ALFA Best of the Best Awards are presented at the annual ALFA Conference.

The ALFA Hero Awards - Annual awards program that recognizes senior living professionals who have shown leadership, initiative and work to improve the quality of life for the residents he/she serves in a senior living community. ALFA Hero Awards are presented at the annual ALFA Conference.

The Horace D'Angelo, Jr. Memorial Awards - recognizes outstanding senior living advocacy efforts. Established in 2010 to honor the late Horace D'Angelo, Jr.
