= Tamir Goodman =

American basketball player

Tamir Goodman תמיר הלוי גודמן
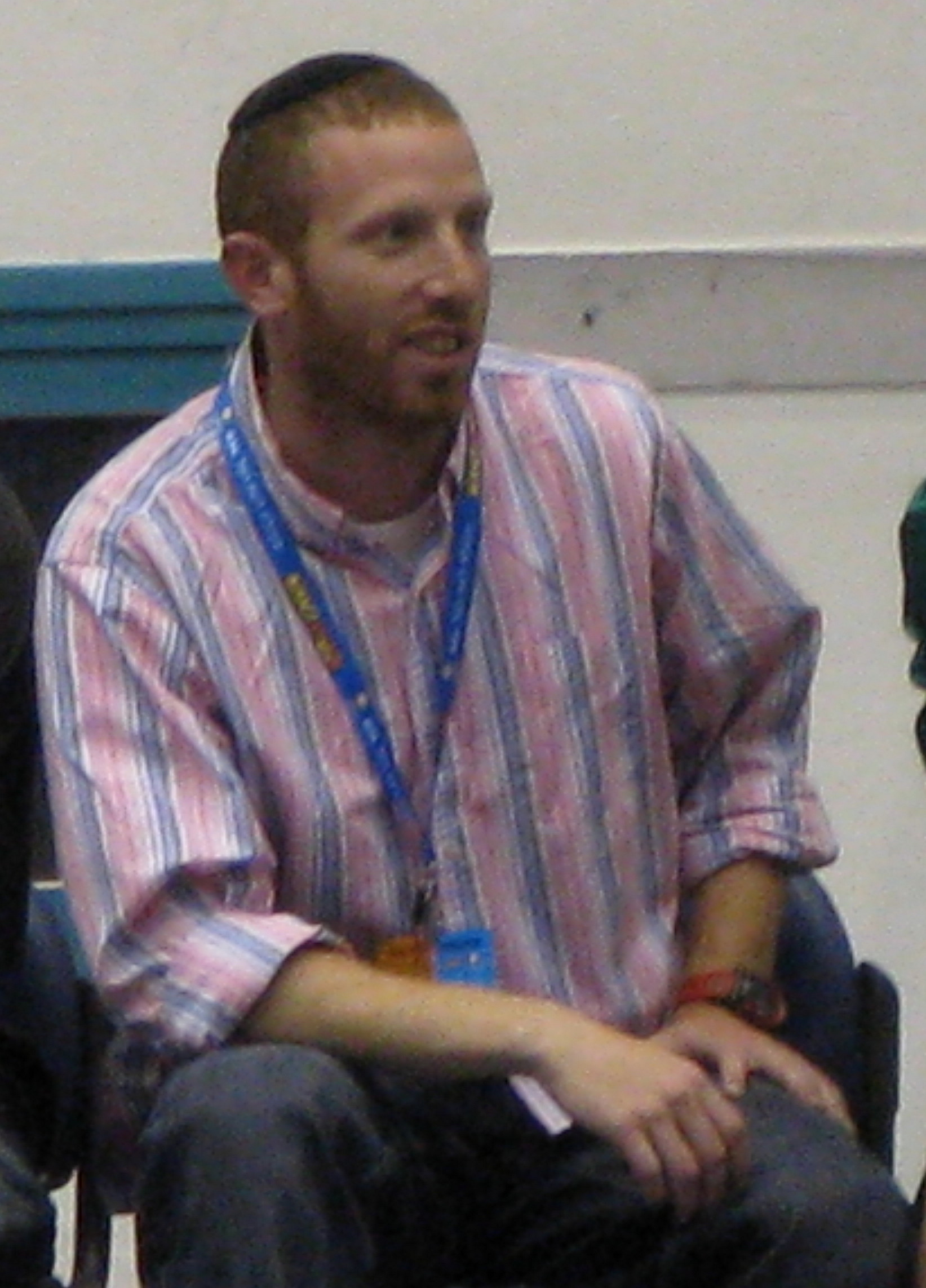

Personal information
- Born: January 18, 1982 (age 44) Baltimore, Maryland
- Listed height: 6 ft 3 in (1.91 m)

Career information
- High school: Talmudical Academy of Baltimore; Takoma Academy
- College: Towson Tigers (1999–2001)
- Playing career: 2002–2009
- Position: Shooting guard
- Number: 22

Career history
- 2002–2003: Maccabi Tel Aviv B.C.
- 2002–2003: → Elitzur Giv'at Shmuel
- 2003–2004: Elitzur Kiryat Ata
- 2005–2006: Elitzur Giv'at Shmuel
- 2006–2007: Maccabi Shoham
- 2008: Maryland Nighthawks
- 2008: Maccabi Haifa B.C.

Tamir Goodman (Hebrew: תמיר הלוי גודמן; born January 18, 1982) is an American-Israeli former professional basketball player. He was dubbed the "Jewish Jordan" by Sports Illustrated magazine.

A highly ranked high school recruit, after playing basketball for the Talmudical Academy of Baltimore in 11th grade, he was ranked the 25th-best high school player in the country, with an average of 35.4 points per game. He accepted a scholarship from Towson University where he made history as the first athlete to play for a Division I college while wearing a kippah and observing the Sabbath.

Goodman then moved to Israel and signed a 3-year contract with Maccabi Tel Aviv in 2002. He was loaned to Giv'at Shmuel for the 2002–03 season, then played for Elitzur Kiryat Ata in the 2003–04 season, and returned to Giva't Shmuel for the 2005–06 season.

He retired from basketball in 2009 and then turned his attention to running basketball camps, clinics, camps, mentoring, consulting, and public speaking. He's also involved with sports tech entrepreneurship and an author.

== Early life ==
Goodman grew up in Baltimore, Maryland, in an Orthodox Jewish family with six brothers and two sisters. He began playing basketball at five years of age, but he first garnered national attention as a junior in high school, averaging 35.4 points per game for the Talmudical Academy of Baltimore. In 11th grade, he was ranked the 25th-best high school player in the country, and was dubbed the name "Jewish Jordan". Goodman graduated from Takoma Academy of Takoma Park, Maryland, in 2000.

== College career ==
Goodman received a scholarship offer to the University of Maryland, which had one of the top-ranked basketball teams in the country. The team's schedule included activities on Friday nights and Saturdays (against the rules of Orthodox Judaism). Maryland's coaching staff and Tamir had friction over his refusal to play on the Sabbath, so he declined Maryland's offer.

Instead, Goodman accepted a scholarship from nearby Towson University. Goodman was the first freshman to start at Towson in eleven seasons. He averaged 6 points, 4 assists, and 2.5 rebounds per game in his freshman year in 2000–2001, and was awarded the coach's award for his performance on the court and in the classroom. Goodman continued at Towson for his sophomore campaign until December 2001, when Goodman filed a complaint that the newly hired coach allegedly assaulted him.

== Professional career ==
=== Maccabi Tel Aviv B.C. (2002) ===
Goodman fulfilled a dream of his by moving to Israel and signing a 3-year contract with Maccabi Tel Aviv on July 22, 2002.

=== Giv'at Shmuel (2002–2003) ===
To get more playing time, Goodman was loaned to Giv'at Shmuel for the 2002–03 season.

=== Elitzur Kiryat Ata (2003–2004) ===
Goodman played for Elitzur Kiryat Ata in the 2003–04 season.

=== Return to Giv'at Shmuel (2005–2006) ===
Goodman went on to serve in the Israeli Defense Force, a requirement for all Israeli citizens. He suffered a knee injury that required major surgery. After nine months of intensive physical therapy, he beat the odds and returned to Giva't Shmuel to fulfill his contract for the 2005–06 season.

=== Maccabi Shoham (2006–2007) ===
Still recovering from his injury, Goodman dropped down to Liga Leumit to play for Maccabi Shoham. In his first two games, he played more than 20 minutes and scored close to 20 points a game. But in December 2006, Goodman's left knee gave out again and his doctors ordered him to undergo weeks of physical therapy. He did not get to play again until March 2007.

=== Maryland Nighthawks (2008) ===
In late 2007, Goodman moved back to Maryland to play for the Maryland Nighthawks of the newly formed Premier Basketball League (the league began play in January 2008). In his first game, he suffered a complex dislocation of his finger, which required surgery and a year of physical therapy.

=== Maccabi Haifa (2008) ===
In July 2008, Goodman signed with Maccabi Haifa. After shattering several bones in his left hand in practice, Goodman was unable to play the remainder of the season.

== Retirement ==
In September 2009, Goodman announced his retirement from professional basketball.

== Post Basketball Career ==
After retiring, Goodman focused on what he is passionate about such as running clinics and camps like Haifa Hoops for Kids and the Tamir Goodman Athletic Leadership Basketball Camp. He has coached over 20,000 kids and run basketball camps and programs across the world with former NBA players such as Omri Casspi and Amar'e Stoudemire and Mike Sweetney.

He is the founder of Zone190, a training device being used in the NBA and Aviv Net, a moisturise absorbing and antimicrobial basketball net.

He is the author of "The Jewish Jordan's Triple Threat," and "Live Your Dream," a story of a Jewish All-Star basketball player.

He also does scouting for NBA teams, mentoring & consulting, and public speaking.

He is director of strategic brand initiatives for Fabric.

== Personal ==
Goodman holds a B.A. in Communications and lives in Jerusalem with his wife and five children.

== Bibliography ==
- Tamir Goodman, The Jewish Jordan's Triple Threat

== See also ==
- List of select Jewish basketball players
