= InnSuites Hospitality =

American based Real Estate Investment Trust (REIT)

InnSuites Hospitality Trust
- Type: Public company
- Traded as: AMEX: IHT
- Industry: Real estate investment trust
- Founded: June 21, 1971; 55 years ago
- Headquarters: Phoenix, Arizona, U.S.
- Key people: James F. Wirth, CEO & Chairman; Craig Miller, CFO
- Products: Lodging
- Revenue: ▲$6 million (2020)
- Net income: ▼ -$2 million (2020)
- Total assets: ▼$17 million (2020)
- Total equity: ▲$8 million (2020)
- Owner: James F. Wirth (61.27%)
- Number of employees: 120 (2019)
- Website: www.innsuitestrust.com

InnSuites Hospitality Trust, based in Phoenix, Arizona, is a real estate investment trust that invests in lodging. While it is formed as a real estate investment trust, it is not classified as a real estate investment trust for tax purposes. The company owns interests in two hotels, operates three hotels, provides management for three hotels, and licenses its InnSuites trademark for five hotels. The company's hotel ownership interests are a 51.01% interest in the Best Western InnSuites Tucson Foothills Hotel & Suites in Tucson, Arizona, and a direct 20.33% interest in the Best Western InnSuites Albuquerque Airport Hotel & Suites in Albuquerque, New Mexico.

== History ==
IHT was founded by James Frank Wirth in 1971. That same year, the company became a public company via an initial public offering.

In 1999, the company moved its shares from the New York Stock Exchange to the American Stock Exchange.

In September 2000, the company acquired the Albuquerque Best Western Airport Inn.

In 2004, the company sold the 160-unit InnSuites Hotels & Suites Tempe-Phoenix for $6.8 million to an affiliate of James Wirth, the founder, and sold a 131-unit hotel in San Diego for $9.7 million.

In November 2013, the company announced a partnership with Roomer.

In November 2014, the company purchased the ground under its InnSuites Hotel & Suites Catalina Foothills Best Western property for $2.5 million.

On June 2, 2017, the company sold the InnSuites Ontario California Hotel and Suites property for $17.5 million and repaid debt of $7.2 million.

In August 2018, the company sold IBC Hotels to OBASA Capital Investments for $250,000 and a promissory note in the amount of $2,750,000 with interest to be accrued at 3.75%. IBC provides reservation services with proprietary software and exclusive marketing distribution and services to 2,000 unrelated hospitality properties. In May 2014, IBC had 4,200 hotels in its network and in August 2014, it had over 6,000 hotels in its network.

In October 2018, the company sold the InnSuites Yuma Hotel and Suites Best Western for $16.05 million and repaid debt of $5.6 million.
