= Xenia Hotels & Resorts =

Xenia Hotels & Resorts, Inc.
- Type: Public company
- Traded as: NYSE: XHR; S&P 600 component Russell 2000 component
- Industry: Real estate investment trust
- Founded: 2014; 12 years ago
- Headquarters: Orlando, Florida
- Products: Hotels
- Revenue: ▲US$1.08 billion (2025)
- Net income: ▲US$63.1 million (2025)
- Total assets: ▼US$2.81 billion (2025)
- Total equity: ▼US$1.13 billion (2025)
- Number of employees: 46 (2024)
- Website: xeniareit.com

Xenia Hotels & Resorts, Inc. is a real estate investment trust that invests in hotels. As of December 31, 2024, it owned 31 hotels comprising 9,408 rooms.

== History ==
In 2014, the company was formed as a corporate spin-off of InvenTrust Properties.

On February 4, 2015, the company became a public company.

In December 2016, the company sold 4 hotels for $119 million.

In December 2019, the company sold 2 hotels for $61.5 million.

In March 2020, the company sold 7 Kimpton Hotels & Restaurants-branded hotels for $483 million.
