= Healthpeak Properties =

Real estate investment trust

Healthpeak Properties, Inc.
- Formerly: HCP, Inc. (2007–2019); Health Care Property Investors, Inc. (1985–2007)
- Type: Public company
- Traded as: NYSE: DOC (2024–present); NYSE: PEAK (2019–2024); NYSE: HCP (1985–2019); S&P 500 component
- ISIN: US42250P1030
- Industry: Real estate investment trust
- Founded: 1985; 41 years ago
- Headquarters: Denver, Colorado, U.S.
- Key people: Scott M. Brinker (President and CEO); Kelvin O. Moses (CFO)
- Revenue: ▲US$2.822 billion (2025)
- Net income: ▼US$101 million (2025)
- Total assets: ▲US$20.336 billion (2025)
- Total equity: ▼US$8.142 billion (2025)
- Number of employees: 411 (2025)
- Website: www.healthpeak.com

Healthpeak Properties, Inc. is an American real estate investment trust that invests in senior housing, life science labs, and medical offices. As of December 31, 2025, the company owned interests in 689 properties.

== History ==
The company was founded in May 1985. That year, the company became a public company via an initial public offering.

In September 2007, the company changed its name from Health Care Property Investors, Inc. to HCP, Inc.

In October 2016, the company completed the spin-off of Quality Care Properties.

In October 2019, the company restructured its joint venture with Brookdale Senior Living. HCP acquired Brookdale's 51% interest in 12 properties for $510 million and Brookdale acquired 18 properties from HCP for $405 million.

The company changed its name to Healthpeak Properties, Inc. in November 2019.

In November 2020, the company announced that it will move its headquarters from California to Denver.

In March 2024, the company acquired Physicians Realty Trust.

In March 2026, the company sold a minority interest in Janus Senior Living.

That month, the company began plans for a $4.5 billion, 4.6-million-square-foot mixed-use development in Cambridge, Massachusetts.

In July 2026, the company sold a 49% interest in its $2.1 billion portfolio of outpatient medical buildings to Brookfield Asset Management.
