= Emeritus Senior Living =

Defunct American company

Coordinates: 47.618014°N 122.357977°W

Emeritus Corporation
- Type: Public
- Traded as: NYSE: BKD
- Industry: Senior living
- Founded: 1993 (Renton, Washington)
- Headquarters: Seattle, Washington
- Website: www.emeritus.com

Emeritus Corporation, doing business as Emeritus Senior Living, was a provider of independent living, assisted living, Alzheimer's care, and skilled nursing for seniors living in Emeritus communities throughout the United States. The company was founded in 1993, and was acquired by Brookdale Senior Living (the largest company in the industry at the time) in July 2014 after a $23 million punitive damages award against it in a civil lawsuit in 2013.

Emeritus specialized in assisted living services for seniors who need help with daily activities such as bathing, dressing, meals and medications management. Most communities also provided expert care for Alzheimer's and memory care residents, and offered respite stays for seniors who need short-term stays. Emeritus had locations in 47 states, with several facilities within each state.

== Facilities ==
Company revenues were $1.57 billion in 2012. As a result of the merger with Brookdale, Emeritus now manages 1,100 facilities in 46 states.

== Controversy ==
An episode of Frontline which aired on July 30, 2013, documented the alleged neglect and physical abuses perpetrated on patients by employees of Emeritus. In one civil lawsuit, Joan Boice et al v. Emeritus Corporation, a Sacramento, California jury found Emeritus liable for neglect which apparently resulted in the 2009 death of a patient; the jury assessed the company $23 million in punitive damages. Following the broadcast, Emeritus established a website to dispute the allegations.

== See also ==
- List of companies operating nursing homes
