= InvenTrust Properties =

InvenTrust Properties Corp.
- Type: Public company
- Traded as: NYSE: IVT; S&P 600 component
- Industry: Real estate investment trust
- Founded: 2004; 22 years ago
- Headquarters: Downers Grove, Illinois
- Key people: Daniel J. Busch (President & CEO); Michael Phillips (CFO)
- Products: Shopping malls
- Revenue: ▲$299 million (2025)
- Net income: ▲$111 million (2025)
- Total assets: ▲$2.788 billion (2025)
- Total equity: ▲$1.794 billion (2025)
- Number of employees: 103 (2025)
- Website: inventrustproperties.com

InvenTrust Properties Corp. is a real estate investment trust that invests in shopping malls. As of December 31, 2025, the company owned interests in 73 properties comprising 11.6 million square feet.

== Timeline ==
The company was launched in 2005 as Inland American Real Estate Trust.

In 2012, Inland Western completed an initial public offering.

As of February 2014, the company was the largest non-publicly traded real estate investment trust in the United States.

In March 2014, the firm announced that functions performed by its external, related-party managers would now be performed by the REIT itself.

In September 2014, the company sold its select-service hotel portfolio to NorthStar Realty Finance (now DigitalBridge) for $1.1 billion. The proceeds of $480 million were invested in shopping malls and student housing.

In February 2015, the company completed the corporate spin-off of Xenia Hotels & Resorts to its shareholders.

In April 2015, the company changed its name to InvenTrust Properties.

In April 2016, the company completed the corporate spin-off of Highlands REIT.

In June 2016, the company sold its student housing division to a group including the CPP Investment Board for $1.4 billion.

In October 2021, the company became a public company.

In June 2025, InvenTrust sold five shopping centers in Southern California for $306 million.
