= Roomer =

- Type: Private
- Industry: Travel services
- Founded: 2011
- Headquarters: New York, NY, U.S.
- Key people: Gon Ben David (Founder, CEO) Ben Froumine (Founder)
- Website: Roomertravel.com

Roomer is a travel marketplace company headquartered in New York. Originally created to enable travelers to resell their hotel reservations, Roomer launched its video based travel platform in 2024. Roomer was founded in Tel Aviv by Ben Froumine, Gon Ben David and Adi Zellner in September 2011.

== History ==
The Roomer idea came from one of the co-founders, Gon, who had to cancel his visit to New York and was obligated to pay a significant cancellation fee for a hotel room that he did not use. As a consequence, there was a pricey hotel reservation that could not be made and cancelled without significant fees.

Roomer raised $2 million from the BRM Group, and the Waze co-founder, Uri Levine whose co-founded company acquired by Google for $1 billion, sits on the board of Roomer. Since its startup in January 2013, in less than a year, Roomer has expanded its business to operate worldwide.

The second round of funding was raised $5 million from Series A by Disruptive on November 25, 2014 as reported by Fox Business. Its rapid expansion is partially the results of the enthusiasm from its customers, since more than 75% of sellers are sharing their stories and experiences on Facebook, Twitter and other social networks. One of the important services of Roomer is its discounted reservation offer. After its startup for about one year, the average discount rate of unused hotel reservations from Roomer was 37%.

It launched its first mobile apps for iOS and Android in 2014.
