= Nursing home =

Type of residential care

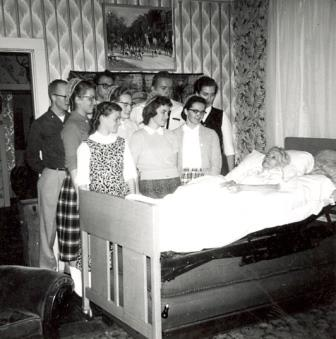
Mennonites visiting a nursing home in 1961

A nursing home is a facility for the residential care of older people, senior citizens, or disabled people. Nursing homes may also be referred to as care homes, skilled nursing facilities (SNF), rest homes, long-term care facilities or more informally old people's homes. Often, these terms have slightly different meanings to indicate whether the institutions are public or private, and whether they provide mostly assisted living, or nursing care and emergency medical care. Nursing homes are used by people who do not need to be in a hospital, but require care that is hard to provide in a home setting. The nursing home staff attends to the patients' medical and other needs. Most nursing homes have nursing aides and skilled nurses on hand 24 hours a day.

In the United States, while nearly 1 in 10 residents aged 75 to 84 stays in a nursing home for five or more years, nearly 3 in 10 residents in that age group stay less than 100 days, the maximum duration covered by Medicare, according to the American Association for Long-Term Care Insurance. Some nursing homes also provide short-term rehabilitative stays following surgery, illness, or injury. Services may include physical therapy, occupational therapy, or speech-language therapy. Nursing homes also offer other services, such as planned activities and daily housekeeping. Nursing homes may offer memory care services, often called dementia care.

== History ==
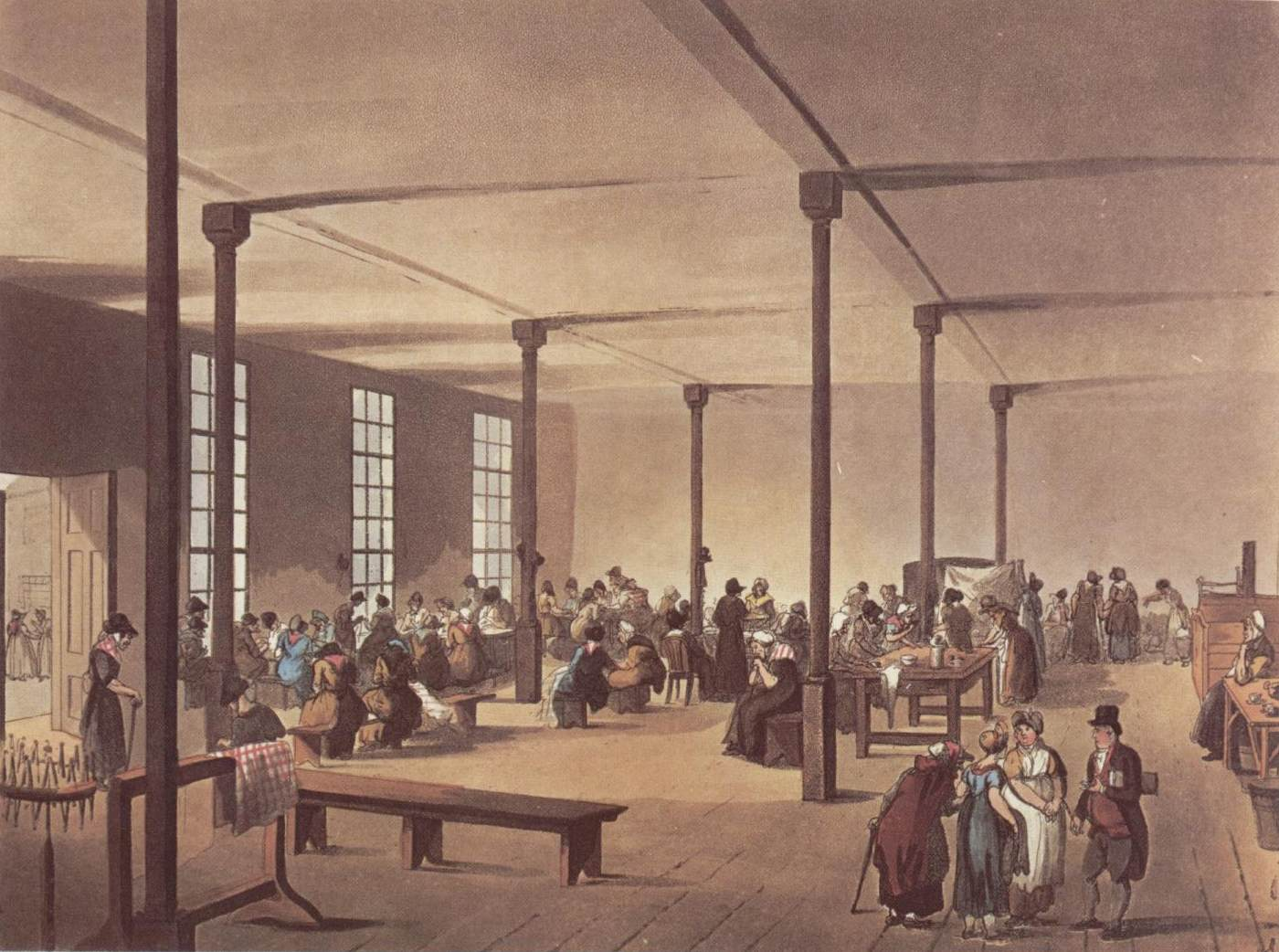
Poorhouses/workhouses were the first implemented national framework to provide a basic level of care to the old and infirm. Pictured, is "The workroom at St James's workhouse" from The Microcosm of London (1808).

From before the 17th century to modern day, many families care for their elders in the family's home. While this is still common practice for many communities and families around the world, this has become increasingly more difficult over time as life expectancy increases, family size decreases, and increased expertise in caring for a person with a chronic disease is needed. In the late 20th century and 21st century, nursing homes have become a standard form of care for most aged and incapacitated persons to account for those complexities. Nearly 6 percent of older adults are sheltered in residential facilities that provide a wide range of care. Yet such institutions have not always existed; rather, their history and development reflect relatively recent demographic and political realities that shape the experience of growing old.

=== 17th century ===
In the 17th century, poorhouses (also referred to as almshouses) originated in England as municipalities were expected to care for their poor. Orphans, people determined to be mentally ill, and elderly people were often placed into these living commons while able-bodied individuals were expected to work and could be imprisoned if they refused. This model was brought to North America by English settlers. Before the 19th century, no age-restricted institutions existed for long-term care; elderly individuals, who needed shelter because of incapacity, impoverishment, or family isolation, often ended their days in an almshouse. Placed alongside people deemed insane, people who were inebriated, or people who were homeless, they were simply categorized as part of the community's most needy recipients. Poorhouses gave a place where they could be given shelter and daily meals.

=== 19th and 20th centuries ===
In the 1800s in the US, women's and church groups began to establish special homes for elderly people. Often concerned that individuals of their own ethnic or religious communities might die alongside the most despised society, this led to the creation of private care facilities for the elderly in these communities. Poorhouses continued to exist into the early 20th century, but were not as common due to the social welfare programs that were rising. In the US, the Great Depression overwhelmed the poorhouses, leading to not enough space and funding. Due to muckraking in the 1930s, the less-than-favorable living conditions of the poorhouses were exposed to the public. This led to the provision of the Social Security Act (1935) to only give people their pension if they did not live in poorhouses, but could live in private institutions.

=== US evolution ===
In the US, poorhouses were then replaced with residential living homes, known as board-and-care homes or convalescent homes. These board-and-care homes provided basic levels of care and meals in a private setting for a specific fee. Board-and-care homes proved to be a success and by World War II, the new way of nursing homes began to take shape. As the times continued to change, the government identified the issue of people spending extensive amounts of time in hospitals. To combat these long stays in short-term settings, board-and-care homes began to convert into something more public and permanent that was state and federally funded. From this, by 1965 nursing homes were a solid fixture. Nursing homes were a permanent residence where the elderly and disabled could receive any necessary medical care and receive daily meals. These nursing homes showed improvement in maintaining care and cleanliness standards in comparison to almshouses and poorhouses. From the 1950s through the 1970s, the dynamics of nursing homes began changing significantly. In the United States, Medicare and Medicaid began to make up much of the money that would filter through the homes and the 1965 amendment laws enforced nursing homes to comply with safety codes and required registered nurses to be on hand at all times. Additionally, nursing homes may sue children for the costs of caring for their parents in jurisdictions which have filial responsibility laws. Later in 1987, in the US the Nursing Reform Act was introduced to begin defining the different types of nursing home services and later added the Residents' Bill of Rights.

=== World War II ===
In the UK, after World War II many soldiers and civilians needing hospital care due to war casualties were placed in the hospital along with the many elderly patients present there, leading to overcrowding. The implementation of the NHS in 1948 and the abolition of the Old Poor Law allowed modern public nursing homes to be built. In the 1950s, Professor Peter Townsend brought to light the discrepancies in the standard of care between the publicly and privately funded care homes, leading to health policy reforms that assured the standard care practices for the elderly living in NHS funded care homes. The 1980s and 1990s saw care homes becoming a large industry in the UK, with the Registered Homes Act 1984 regulating private care homes and the Care Standards Act of 2000 ensuring that patient needs are met.

=== 21st century ===
In the 21st century, nursing homes are varied. Some nursing homes still resemble a hospital while others look more like a home. Nursing home residents can pay for their care out of pocket or with government assistance. In the US, others may receive Medicare for a short time, while in other countries, public assistance may be available, and some may use long-term insurance plans. Across the spectrum, most nursing homes in the US will accept Medicaid as a source of payment.

== Considerations ==
Below are a few reasons to consider a nursing home:

- Managing a worsening and progressive disease such as Alzheimers or Parkinson's Disease.
- For assistance after a hospital discharge and not being able or ready to independently care for oneself at home.
- When medical needs at home become unmanageable by the primary caregiver at home.
- When activities and socialization with people of similar age is in decline or very low.
- When primary caregivers at home do not have the proper knowledge of the nutrition or other care needed.
- When there is no sense of recognition towards danger.
- When there is a decrease in ability to perform the basic activities of daily life.
- When the current home environment is no longer safe or fitting to the person's needs or conditions.

When looking into nursing homes, consider what activities and/or medical needs the prospective resident would need from the nursing home. Consider things such as financial costs, whether medical insurance is accepted in whole or part and personal funds for routine costs of living that are not included with the nursing home. Ensure the nursing home is properly licensed, has qualified staff as well as the staff to resident ratio. If time allows, visit the nursing home in person to receive a walk through of the facility and, if given the chance, speak with a resident to consider their opinion of the home.

== Staff ==
In the United States, nursing home employees are all required to be licensed or uphold a certificate in the state of which they work. In most facilities, nursing homes are required to provide enough staff to adequately care for residents. In the US, for instance, nursing homes must have at least one registered nurse (RN) available for at least 8 straight hours a day throughout the week, and at least one licensed practical nurse (LPN) on duty 24 hours a day. Direct care nursing home employees usually include registered nurses, licensed practical nurses, social workers, certified nursing assistants, and physical therapists, amongst others.

=== Medical staff ===
==== Nurses ====
Nursing homes require assessment and monitoring of residents by a registered nurse (RN) who is typically required to have between two and six years of education. The RN's job duties include implementing care plans, administering medications, recording and maintaining accurate reports for each resident, monitoring and recording medical changes, and providing direction to the nursing assistants and licensed practical nurses (LPN). This is referred to as a head nurse or charge nurse for the unit. RNs are not required to choose a specialization, but to gain recognition as a specialized nurse professional, RNs typically need education in their specialized field, and further experience through clinical practices.

==== Licensed Practical Nurse ====
Typically an LPN is working under the supervision of an RN, and often LPNs are typically required to have a year of training before working with any patients. The LPN monitors residents' well-being and administers treatments and medications, such as dressing wounds and dispensing prescribed drugs. LPNs are responsible for patients' direct bed care and carry out a daily routine. There are also some restrictions for an LNP when providing care. Some of them are providing medications through an IV, prescription of medication, diagnosing any type of medical condition, and coming up with care plans. Considering these limitations, caring for more complicated patients might become harder for an LPN.

==== RN & LPN ====
Despite the difference between the tasks these two groups of nurses can provide, the contribution between both of them in a nursing home improves the quality of care. While LPN staff works on less complicated residents, it allows them the chance to monitor closely and report to their RN of any drastic change of condition. Meanwhile, an RN can focus on the much broader side of care planning for each resident. The monitoring and communication between both healthcare professionals increases the level of patient care.

==== Nursing assistants ====
To be able to provide any type of care, a nursing assistant needs a certification and state approved test. A nursing assistant provides basic care to patients while working directly under a LPN or RN. These basic care activities, also referred to as activities of daily living, can include assisting with bathing and dressing residents, helping residents with meals, either serving them or with feeding, transferring to and from the bed or wheelchair, making and cleaning beds, assisting with toileting, and answering call lights. Besides the basic tasks a nursing assistant is hired to do, the job goes beyond that. Serving as a key middle man between the residents and the rest of the nursing staff. A certified nursing assistant is essentially spending more time helping residents, allowing them to distinguish changes of conditions and behaviors to be reported to their nurse. Nursing assistants' official titles can vary between jurisdictions and facilities. They can include Certified Nursing Assistants (CNAs), nursing aides, caregivers, patient care associates, patient care technicians, personal care attendants (PCAs), and care assistants.

==== Hospice Nurses and Aides ====
The hospice department focuses on the care provided through a limiting life illness of a resident, but as well as the emotional support to residents support system. Hospice nurses not only monitor the change of condition of the resident, but also serve as patient advocates and case managers. A hospice nurse is able to monitor residents with vital signs, provide medication if it is for the best interest of the resident, and also be able to discontinue medication that might no longer be needed. Hospice aides are essentially certified nursing assistants. They offer personal care like bathing, dressing and feeding, and are also in charge of documentation over the residents they care for along with reporting any change of condition. If the resident were to be obtaining hospice care from home, the aide is also to assist with medical equipment and potentially light housekeeping. The agencies to which these hospice providers work are connected to the nursing home, or could be hired separately by the family of the resident. Essentially a hospice team is there to provide comfort to the resident, but also emotional support to both the resident and the family. Helping them assimilate the changes that will be happening is a key goal for any hospice team.

==== Physicians ====
At a skilled nursing facility, patients receive 24 hour care supervised by a licensed physician. Opposed to nursing homes that aren't much on the skilled spectrum rely on visiting the physicians like family doctors, or doctors sent by private agencies when requested by patient, family or facility. Specialized physicians like cardiologists or nephrologists may also make independent visits to provide their care. Overall the visits from the physician are to assess any changes nurses provide them with, and use the power of their knowledge to plan towards their medical condition. The facilities should respond to a physician's progress notes and ensure they are able to provide further care that physicians might be suggesting.

=== Non-medical staff ===
==== Administration ====
Depending on the size of the nursing home, a nursing home may have either a nursing home administrator or an executive director. Some nursing homes may have both, but their job duties are similar and can include overseeing staff, supplying medical supplies, and financial matters. A director of nursing can also be found working at a nursing home. Their main task is to oversee the nursing staff including nurses and certified nurses assistants. The director of nursing can also provide a voice for their nursing staff when speaking about concerns or necessities in the department to the higher administration. Some nursing homes also have human resources personnel, who are in charge of all aspects of hiring new employees. Human resources job duties vary but can also include coordinating payroll, organizing orientation programs for new employees, interviewing, disciplinary actions, and ensuring compliance with federal and state laws. Nursing homes are usually licensed and heavily regulated under governing legislation. Compliance with the federal and state legislatures are reviewed regularly for adherence to strict standards of building codes, care plans, behavior and altercations between residents, nutrition and dietary services, medical services, nursing and personal care, religious and spiritual practices, pets, and recreational programs.

==== Housekeeping ====
Housekeepers perform everyday cleaning and upkeep in nursing homes. They play a huge part in ensuring that nursing homes are kept clean and free of disease causing agents. Housekeepers have a long list of duties which include cleaning floors, changing linens, disinfecting bathrooms, changing towels, washing clothes, emptying trashcans, sanitizing rooms, replenishing supplies, dusting, vacuuming, and keeping windows and woodwork clean. These duties can vary from facility to facility, but will include basic cleaning. Housekeeping does not require any license or schooling, but some jobs may prefer experienced housekeepers.

==== Recreational staff ====
Recreational staff usually include an activity director and possibly activity assistants depending on the size of the nursing home. Activities aim to meet each resident's emotional, intellectual, physical, social, spiritual, and vocational needs. The transition from being independent to having to depend on others and be away from home is oftentimes very difficult, which is why activities are important to combat depression and anxiety. Some of the different activities that may be offered include hosting birthday parties, celebrating holidays, book clubs, musical events, outdoor activities, discussion and social groups, exercise, arts and crafts, pet therapy, religious services and community outings. Volunteer involvement is also an important part of nursing home activities given that volunteers can act as a link between the nursing home and the outside community.

== Therapy ==
=== Occupational therapy ===
One of the many services offered in a nursing home is occupational therapy. Occupational therapy may be necessary following an injury or illness in order to regain skills, and to receive support during any physical or cognitive changes. Occupational therapy will focus on activities of daily living such as bathing, dressing, grooming. Occupational therapy also assists with instrumental activities of daily living, which include home and financial management, rest and sleep, education, work, play, leisure, and social participation. Occupational therapists work to allow the person to safely and comfortably reintegrate into society by practicing public dining, and transferring to different surfaces (chairs, beds, couches etc.), and will assess the need for any home modifications or safety equipment to ensure a proper and safe transition. When a cognitive and/or perceptual deficit is presented, therapists will work with the person by teaching strategies to maximize memory, sequencing and attention span length.

=== Physical therapy ===
Another important service found in a nursing home is physical therapy. Physical therapy may be necessary following an injury, illness or surgery. Physical therapy works with the person to help them regain strength, endurance, flexibility, balance and range of motion. It can also help to prevent injuries and accidents by focusing on restoring mobility, increasing fitness levels, reducing pain and overall reaching a certain point of independence. Most of the time a nurses certified aid will wait to transfer a resident until they are assessed by PT to help diminish injuries to both staff and resident. There are many conditions that can benefit from receiving physical therapy in a nursing home. These conditions include arthritis, pain associated with cancer, dementia, Alzheimer's, stroke and incontinence.

=== Speech language therapy ===
Speech-language pathology is another service found in a nursing home. Speech language pathologists specialize in working with those who have a difficult time with language and/or speech, usually following an injury or an underlying diagnoses. The SLP will evaluate the person's speech. If the person is having trouble with speech, this points to an issue with coordinating the movements and muscles used to produce speech. Trouble with language points to the person having difficulty with understanding what they are hearing and seeing. The SLP will also look at difficulty with swallowing food and will evaluate the person in order to figure out which part of the swallowing process is not working. Some of the many speech disorders worked with by the SLP are:

- phonology meaning the speech patterns used,
- apraxia meaning difficulty with coordinating the movements needed to make sounds,
- receptive language meaning difficulty understanding language,
- fluency meaning stuttering,
- expressive language meaning difficulty using language,

and many other disorders.

== Elder abuse ==
Elder abuse is more prevalent in hospitalized settings including nursing homes than in the general community. There are six major types of abuses reported in nursing homes: physical, emotional, sexual, financial, verbal and neglect.

=== Physical abuse ===
Physical abuse is the intention or action to hurt an older person or senior citizen resulting in scars and bruising. The usage of restraints in an unsafe matter is also considered physical abuse. Along with isolating the senior from other people or even activities is considered physical abuse. Purposely not proving their schedules or needed medicine is also another form of physical abuse.

=== Emotional abuse ===
Emotional abuse is an abuse which is not physical, but it is targeting to intentionally cause a harmful emotion from a resident. This occurs when an employee makes verbal threats and continuously degrades the patient, resulting in the patient experiencing mood swings, anxiety, and depression. Purposely ignoring a resident's requests, or need for help can result in emotional abuse due to the emotions being caused by the action of ignoring.

=== Sexual abuse ===
Sexual abuse is when an elderly patient is being forced into unwanted sexual activity by an employee, resident or visitor, usually attempted and reported when the patient is sleeping, sick, or weak. Sexual harassment is also part of sexual abuse. This can be unwanted sexual comments and even the exposure of pornography or other sexual material.

=== Financial abuse ===
Financial abuse or exploitation is a result of any time of theft that involves money and even credit cards. The limitations of the residents sometimes leave nursing staff to handle their financial wellbeing as well which is where fraud can be done. Healthcare fraud is also considered financial abuse. This is when a resident is charged for a service or equipment used on them, that is not considered necessary. Identity theft is also another form of financial abuse, because personal information like social security is on file, residents are often exposed to identity fraud.

=== Verbal abuse ===
Verbal abuse is a form of use that has no physical contact, but is constructed of words that intend to humiliate, and insult. This type of abuse is not only done by staff, but also other residents. The dynamic that this type of abuse leaves in a nursing home is not a comfortable one. In fact it can cause long term effects on the ones being conflicted with verbal abuse. Some of the long term effects can be depression, excess of fear and many more.

=== Neglect ===
Nursing home neglect is similar to elder abuse. It is when employees begin to repeatedly ignore and leave a patient alone, don’t help with personal hygiene like bathing and brushing of teeth, give too little food or water, or fail to provide the accurate medication. One factor unique to elder abuse in nursing homes is that many nursing home contracts require residents to sign delegation clauses, giving up their right to trial by jury and instead using an arbitrator to settle disputes. In states such as Connecticut, nursing home abuse is considered a felony charge with minimum mandatory sentences.

== By country ==
=== Canada ===
Long-term care facilities exist under three major types: privately owned, non-profit/charitable, and municipal. Regardless of their ownership, aspects of funding, admission criteria, and cost to the individuals are all regulated by their respective provincial governments. As medical care is publicly funded in Canada, all long-term care facilities receive funding from provincial governments for the health care component of the residence – the nurses and personal support workers. Residents pay daily rates for 'room and board' (accommodation and food) that are determined by the type of room chosen, either shared or private. Provincial governments manage waiting lists for long-term care facilities. People who cannot afford to pay the monthly fees receive subsidies, and no one is refused due to inability to pay.

=== United Kingdom ===
In the United Kingdom, care homes and care homes with nursing are regulated by different organizations in England, Scotland, Wales and Northern Ireland. To enter a care home, a candidate patient needs an assessment of needs and of their financial condition from their local council. The candidate may also have an assessment by a nurse, should the patient require nursing care. The cost of a care home is means tested in England.

Care homes for adults in the UK are regulated by different organizations depending on the country:

- In Wales the Care Standards Inspectorate for Wales has responsibility for oversight.
- In Scotland the Care Inspectorate are in charge of the regulation in Scotland.
- In Northern Ireland the Regulation and Quality Improvement Authority in Northern Ireland.
- In England the Care Quality Commission (CQC) are the ones to regulate in the area.

==== 21st century ====
In 2002, nursing homes became known as care homes with nursing, and residential homes became known as care homes. The difference being the level of care both of these offer. Care homes with nursing are the typical nursing homes in the United States offering medical care and support seven days a week, and 24 hours a day. While residential homes help provide the resident with personal care, but they also push them to keep being independent with what they can.

As of April 2009, the lower capital limit is £13,500. At this level, all income from pensions, savings, benefits and other sources, except a "personal expenses allowance" (currently £21.90), goes towards paying the care home fees. The local council pays the remaining contribution provided the room occupied is not more expensive than the local council's normal rate. The NHS has full responsibility for funding the whole placement if the resident is in a care home with nursing that meets the criteria for NHS continuing Health Care. This is identified by a multidisciplinary assessment process.

In May 2010, a coalition government announced the formation of an independent commission on the funding of long-term care, to look into how to pay for long term care for the elderly. The group delivered its recommendations on Monday 4 July 2011. While Care Quality Commission implemented a re-registration process, completed in October 2010, which will result in a new form of regulation being outlined in April 2011.

In 2020, it emerged that some UK care home residents had blanket Do Not Attempt Resuscitation (DNACPR) orders applied during the COVID-19 pandemic. These decisions were made without discussion with the patients involved, and the practice is being investigated by the Care Quality Commission. These decisions were taken during COVID-19 when people did not want extreme measures taken if they flat lines or stopped breathing. In order to be able to implement this into their care, it had to be spoken to a healthcare professional.

As of 2025, care homes in the United Kingdom are going through a supply and demand wave. There is an average of 17,000 care homes opened to the elderly, but even then the level of demand for a space in these homes is not good compared to their supply. There is an estimate that in the next 10 years the United Kingdom will have to develop around 144,000 care home beds to be able to keep up with their demand.

=== United States ===
In the United States, there are three main types of nursing facilities (NFs).

Intermediate Care Facility

An intermediate care facility (ICF) is a health care facility for individuals who are disabled, elderly, or non-acutely ill, usually providing less intensive care than that offered at a hospital or skilled nursing facility. Typically an ICF is privately paid by the individual or by the individual's family. An individual's private health insurance and/or a third party service like a hospice company may cover the cost. Board and Care Homes are special facilities designed to provide those who require assisted living services both living quarters and proper care. Often referred to as residential care homes, these facilities can either be located in a small residential home (as is the case with group home)s or a large modern facility. In fact, a large majority of board and care homes are designed to accommodate fewer than 6 people. Board and care homes are typically staffed by licensed professionals, including nurses, doctors and other medical professionals. These facilities are highly regulated in order to ensure that the best possible care is being provided for the residents. Board and care homes offer residents 24-hour assistance, making them a highly popular choice for those in need of regular assistance.

Assisted Living Facility

Assisted living residences or assisted living facilities (ALFs) are housing facilities for people with disabilities, usually the elderly. These facilities provide supervision or assistance with activities of daily living (ADLs); ALFs are an eldercare alternative on the continuum of care for people, for whom independent living is not appropriate but who do not need the 24-hour medical care provided by a nursing home and are too young to live in a retirement home. Assisted living is a philosophy of care and services promoting independence and dignity.

Skilled Nursing Facility

A skilled nursing facility (SNF) is a nursing home certified to participate in, and be reimbursed by Medicare. Medicare is the federal program primarily for the aged (65+) who contributed to Social Security and Medicare while they were employed. Medicaid is the federal program implemented with each state to provide health care and related services to those who are below the poverty line. Each state defines poverty and therefore Medicaid eligibility. Those eligible for Medicaid may be low-income parents, children (including those in State Children's Health Insurance Programs (SCHIPs) and maternal-child wellness and food programs), seniors, and people with disabilities. The Centers for Medicare and Medicaid Services is the component of the US Department of Health and Human Services (DHHS) that oversees Medicare and Medicaid. A large portion of Medicare and Medicaid dollars is used each year to cover nursing home care and services for the elderly and disabled. State governments oversee the licensing of nursing homes. In addition, states have a contract with CMS to monitor those nursing homes that want to be eligible to provide care to Medicare and Medicaid beneficiaries. Congress established minimum requirements for nursing homes that want to provide services under Medicare and Medicaid. These requirements are broadly outlined in the Social Security Act, which also entrusts the Secretary of Health and Human Services with the responsibility of monitoring and enforcing these requirements. CMS is also charged with the responsibility of working out the details of the law and how it will be implemented, which it does by writing regulations and manuals.

== See also ==
- American Medical Directors Association
- Care Quality Commission
- Child care
- Elderly care
- Home care
- International Association of Homes and Services for the Aging
- List of companies operating nursing homes
- Retirement community
- Caring for people with dementia
