= ProMedica Senior Care =

Healthcare organization in Perrysburg, United States

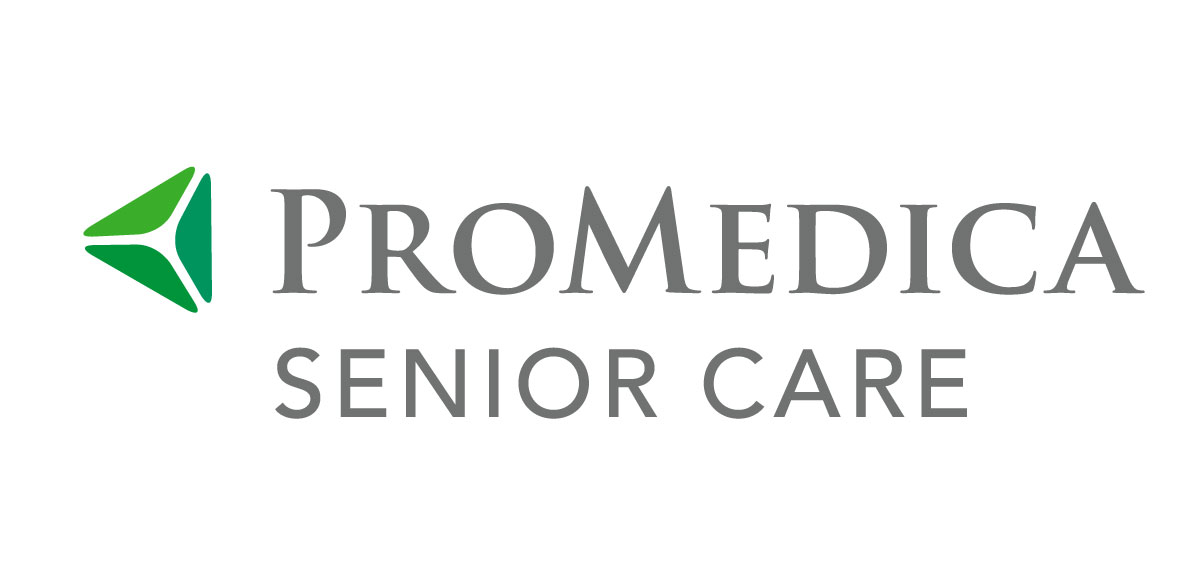
- ProMedica Senior Care Logo

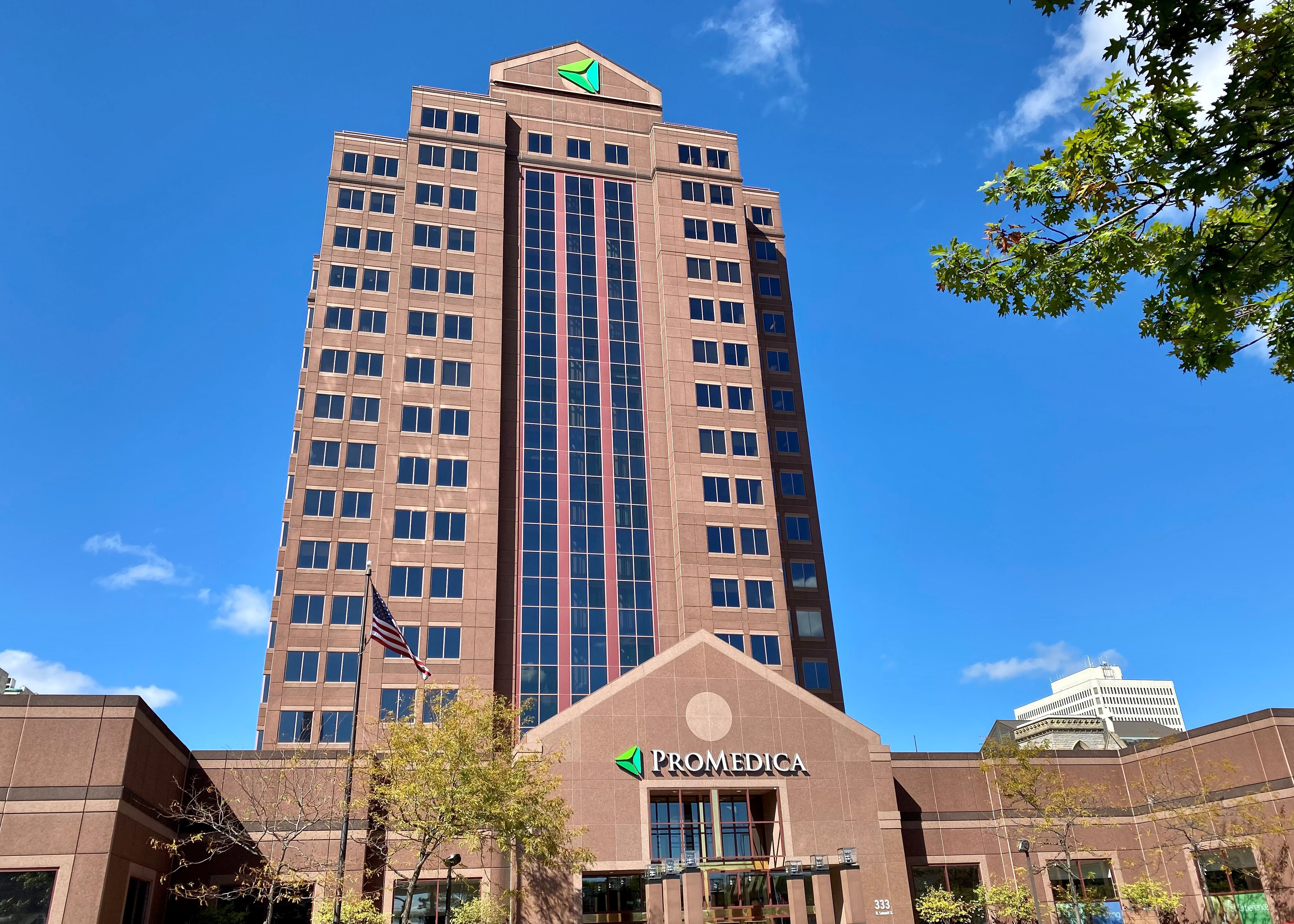
- The ProMedica Senior Care Headquarters in Toledo, Ohio
- Type: Subsidiary
- Industry: Healthcare
- Founded: 1959
- Headquarters: Toledo, Ohio, USA
- Owner: Welltower and Integra Health
- Website: www.hcr-manorcare.com

ProMedica Senior Care, formerly HCR ManorCare Inc, is a major provider in the United States of both short-term post-acute and long-term care. As of 2020, it had more than 300 skilled nursing and rehabilitation centers, assisted living facilities hospice and home health care offices, and over 45,000 employees. The company is headquartered in Toledo, Ohio. In July 2007, it agreed to a $4.9 billion buyout offer from the private equity firm Carlyle Group. In 2018, HCR ManorCare filed for bankruptcy protection and agreed to be taken over by its landlord, Quality Care Properties and in April 2018, Quality Care Properties was acquired by a joint venture between Welltower and ProMedica. In November 2022, ProMedica announced it would end its joint venture with Welltower and would cede its 15% ownership of ProMedica Senior Care. Welltower announced a partnership with Integra Health shortly after which will take over control of all but 10 skilled nursing facilities from ProMedica. ProMedica will continue to operate the assisted living facilities gained under the original agreement.

== Operations ==
The company operates primarily under the Heartland, ManorCare Health Services and Arden Courts names. In 2006, it earned $167 million on sales of $3.6 billion.

As of the end of 2015, the company operated 243 skilled nursing facilities, 55 assisted living facilities, 109 hospice and home health offices, and 92 outpatient therapy clinics, located in 28 states, primarily in Florida, Illinois, Michigan, Ohio, and Pennsylvania. About 73% of its revenue comes from higher-paying Medicare and private-pay patients.

As of the end of 2020, the company had approximately 45,000 employees, including part-time employees. About 6,000 employees were salaried; the rest were hourly employees. About 1,000 employees were members of labor unions.

== History ==
ManorCare began in 1959, when Stewart W. Bainum Sr., a former plumber, opened a nursing home in Wheaton, Maryland. The company went public in 1969.

In 1980, the company merged with the hotel company Quality International, later renamed Choice Hotels, which was also run by Bainum. In 1982, the company acquired nursing home operator Cenco, for $209 million; total facilities were 105, in 19 states. In 1987, Stewart Bainum Jr., became chairman and CEO, succeeding his father.

In 1992, the company spun off Vitalink Pharmacy Services into a public company with a value of $236 million. In 1996, the company spun off Choice Hotels, refocusing its business on health care.

In 1998, Ohio-based Health Care and Retirement Corporation merged with ManorCare to become HCR ManorCare. The company headquarters was consolidated in Toledo.

In March 2000, Stewart W. Bainum Jr., and a management group made separate offers to buy the company, which the company's board rejected. His term as chairman of the board ended in 2001, and in 2002 he left the Board.

== 2007 buyout offer ==
In July 2007, the company agreed to a $4.9 billion buyout offer from the private equity firm Carlyle Group; it will no longer be a publicly traded corporation. Analysts said that Carlyle was interested in the company because it owns, rather than leases, nearly all its own facilities and boasts arguably the best real-estate portfolio in the business, with generally well-maintained, newer facilities in good locations, and little mortgage debt. By borrowing against the property to finance the buyout, ManorCare and Carlyle can carry out the deal on favorable terms. The buyout was completed at $67 per share on December 21, 2007.

In 2010 HCR ManorCare entered into a sale-leaseback transaction whereby the company sold off 338 post-acute, skilled nursing and assisted living facilities for US$6.1 billion. These are now owned by HCP, a REIT based within the state of California. These assets are still operated by HCR ManorCare.

== 2018 Welltower and ProMedica joint venture ==
In March 2018, HCR ManorCare Inc, filed for Chapter 11 protection with $7.1 billion of debt as part of a pre-arranged deal to transfer ownership to its landlord Quality Care Properties Inc.

Welltower Inc., in a $1.95 billion all-cash deal, acquired Quality Care Properties as a joint venture with ProMedica in April 2018. ProMedica acquired the operations of what was then HCR ManorCare for about $1.35 billion in cash plus the assumption of net liabilities. ProMedica began phasing out the "HCR ManorCare" brand in late 2020.

In November 2022, ProMedica announced that it would exit the skilled nursing venture with Welltower.
