= Stewart W. Bainum Sr. =

American businessman and philanthropist (1919–2014)

- Born: Stewart William Bainum; June 10, 1919; Detroit, Michigan, U.S.
- Died: February 12, 2014 (aged 94); Baltimore, Maryland, U.S.
- Education: Mount Vernon Academy
- Alma mater: Washington Adventist University (did not graduate)
- Occupation: Businessman
- Spouse: Jane Goyne
- Children: 2 sons (including Stewart W. Bainum Jr.), 2 daughters (including Barbara Bainum, CEO of Commonweal)
- Relatives: Duke Bainum (nephew)

Stewart William Bainum Sr. (June 10, 1919 – February 12, 2014) was an American businessman and philanthropist. He was the founder, chairman and chief executive officer of the multinational hotel chain Choice Hotels and HCR ManorCare, a retirement facility chain. He was also the founder of the Commonweal Foundation (now known as the Bainum Family Foundation), a philanthropic organization.

== Early life ==
Stewart W. Bainum Sr. was born on June 10, 1919, in Detroit, Michigan. His father, Charles Bainum, worked for the Ford Motor Company in Detroit until he was dismissed during the Great Depression and found work instead with the Works Progress Administration in Cincinnati, Ohio. He had two brothers, Robert and Irvin, and a sister, June Hill.

Stewart was educated at the Mount Vernon Academy, a Seventh-day Adventist boarding school in Mount Vernon, Ohio. He was forced to drop out due to financial distress, but was able to return to finish his studies after picking up work in the D.C. area. He subsequently attended the Washington Adventist University.

== Business career ==
Bainum hitch-hiked to Washington, D.C., in 1936, where he took menial jobs. With his savings, he started a plumbing business. He later became a real estate developer and real estate investor. He served as the chairman of Realty Investment Co.

Bainum was the co-founder of a hotel in Silver Spring, Maryland, in 1957. Over the years, he opened more hotels and founded Quality Inns International, later known as Choice Hotels. He served as its chairman and chief executive officer until 1987, and served on its board of directors until 2000.

Meanwhile, Bainum opened a retirement facility with his brother in 1960. Over the years, he opened more than 200 retirement facilities and established Manor Care. Through a 1998 merger with the Health Care and Retirement Corp., it became known as HCR ManorCare. He served as its chairman and chief executive officer until 1987 and served on its board of directors until 2000.

== Philanthropy ==
Bainum co-founded the Commonweal Foundation, now known as the Bainum Family Foundation, with his wife in 1968. Through their foundation, they donated US$12 million to students from lower socio-economic backgrounds in Washington, D.C. and Baltimore. Moreover, under the aegis of the I Have A Dream Foundation, he covered the college tuition of Kramer Junior High School graduates in 1988.

== Personal life ==
Bainum married Jane Goyne in 1941. They resided in Silver Spring, followed by Chevy Chase, Maryland. They had two sons, Stewart W. Bainum Jr. and Bruce Bainum, and two daughters, Barbara and Roberta.

== Death ==
Bainum died of pneumonia on February 12, 2014, at the Johns Hopkins Hospital in Baltimore, Maryland.
