= Brookdale Senior Living =

American healthcare company

Brookdale Senior Living Solutions
- Type: Public
- Traded as: NYSE: BKD
- Industry: Retirement homes, Assisted living
- Founded: 1978
- Headquarters: Brentwood, Tennessee, U.S.
- Number of locations: Over 586
- Key people: Nick Stengle (Chief Executive Officer)
- Revenue: ▲US$3.02 billion (2020)
- Number of employees: 62,550 (2017)
- Website: www.brookdale.com

Brookdale Senior Living Solutions owns and operates retirement homes across the United States. The company was established in 1978 and is based in Brentwood, Tennessee. It is the largest operator of senior housing in the United States, with over 51,000 residents as of December 31, 2025.

In 2021, a New York Times investigation revealed that Brookdale submitted wrong and manipulated data to the government, thus inflating ratings of the quality of care in Brookdale's facilities. Shortly thereafter, the state of California filed a lawsuit against Brookdale alleging that the company manipulated the federal government’s nursing-home ratings system.

Brookdale's headquarters remain in Tennessee, but a recent acquisition has made Milwaukee, Wisconsin their second largest office.

== History ==
When Brookdale was established, it developed large upscale urban retirement communities in cities such as Chicago, New York, and Miami. The early communities replicated five-star hotels like the Hyatt, Marriott, and Hilton hotels of the modern era.

From the late 1990s to mid-2000s, Brookdale developed more communities that resembled earlier models, but also reflected changing retirement trends. The new communities included Continuous Care Retirement Communities (CCRC), which house skilled nursing facilities, assisted living, independent living, and memory care facilities.

By 2005, Brookdale had grown to approximately 90 standalone properties. During this time Fortress Investments acquired the recently bankrupt Alterra Corporation's 300 properties. Brookdale merged with the American Retirement Corporation (ARC Therapy) in July 2006. ARC operated approximately 130 properties. Fortress saw this as an opportunity to put Brookdale at the forefront of senior living, not just by sheer size but with the marrying of two of the longest-running and most successful companies in the industry. After the ARC merger, Brookdale was operating approximately 550 communities in 36 states.

In July 2014, Brookdale merged with Emeritus Senior Living and became the only national full-spectrum senior living company, with over 1,100 communities in 46 states and covering 80% of the U.S. population.

== Controversy ==
In 2013, a Brookdale facility, Glenwood Gardens in Bakersfield, California, became the focus of national media coverage when a staff member refused to give CPR, as requested by a 911 operator, to 87-year-old Lorraine Bayless, a resident who collapsed in the dining room. Bayless died at Glenwood of a stroke.

After Bayless's death, Brookdale cited a policy to reporters that allegedly prohibited staff members performing CPR on residents of its independent living facilities; however, the spokesman did not provide copies of the policy to reporters. Brookdale later reversed its public position, saying that the staff member had misinterpreted the CPR policy. Police closed the Glenwood investigation without filing any criminal charges. The Bayless family said it had no intention of suing Brookdale over Lorraine's death.

The state of California filed a lawsuit against Brookdale in March 2021, alleging that the company manipulated the federal government’s nursing-home ratings system. A New York Times investigation revealed that the rating system is flawed, allowing the opportunity for many nursing homes (including Brookdale) to submit manipulated data to the government, thus inflating ratings of the quality of care in their facilities.
