= Stewart W. Bainum Jr. =

American businessman and politician

Stewart Bainum
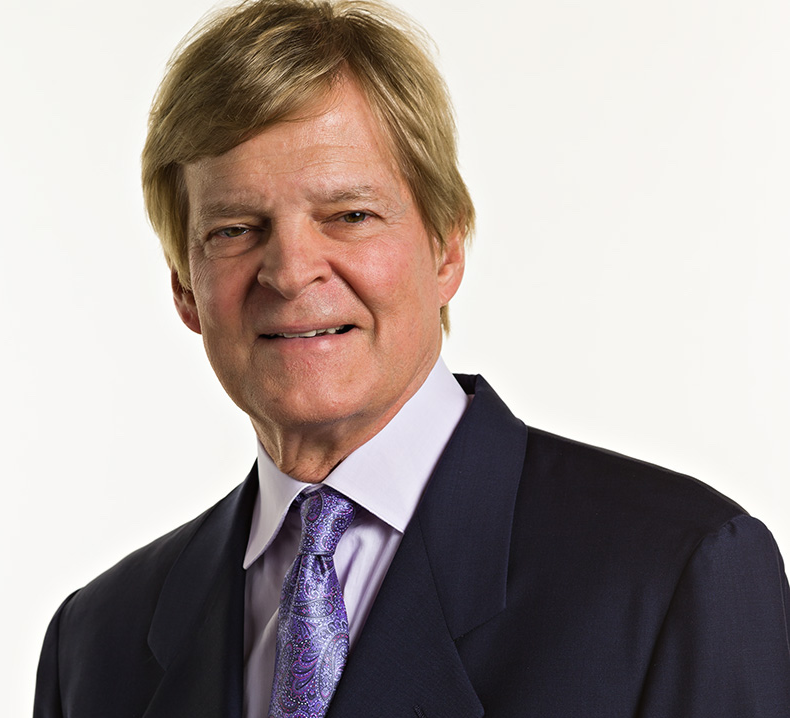
- Born: March 25, 1946 (age 80); Takoma Park, Maryland, U.S.
- Education: Pacific Union College (BA); University of California, Los Angeles (MBA); Andrews University
- Political party: Democratic
- Children: 2
- Relatives: Stewart W. Bainum Sr. (father); Duke Bainum (cousin)

Stewart W. Bainum Jr. (born March 25, 1946) is an American businessman and politician. Bainum is chairman of Choice Hotels International, Inc. Since the 1980s, Bainum has led businesses including four current or former publicly listed companies: Choice Hotels; HCR Manor Care, which operates nursing and assisted living facilities; Vitalink Pharmacy Services; and Sunburst Hospitality.

A Democratic politician, Bainum was a member of the Maryland House of Delegates from 1979 to 1982 and the Maryland Senate from 1983 to 1986.

== Background ==
Stewart W. Bainum Jr. was born March 25, 1946, and raised in Takoma Park, Maryland. He was the second of four children born to Stewart W. Bainum Sr., who was the founder of what became Choice Hotels and HRC Manor Care, and Jane Goyne. Bainum began working for his father's business at age 12 during summer breaks.

Bainum was educated at Takoma Academy, where he was president of his senior class. He received a Bachelor of Arts degree in history from Pacific Union College in Napa Valley, California, in 1968. At Pacific Union, Bainum was president of the campus student association. He received a Master in Business Administration from the UCLA Anderson School of Management in 1970, and taught at Southern College in the Tennessee River Valley. After UCLA, Bainum studied theology at Andrews University in Berrien Springs, Michigan, for 18 months from 1971 to 1972.

== Career ==
=== Business ===
Bainum joined his father's Manor Care business in 1972 as the director of development and became senior vice president two years later. In 1977, Bainum and his father created a five-year strategy to grow the business' nursing home development through a series of acquisitions and became the first nursing home operation with a corporate marketing department. The Washington Business Journal called Bainum the "quarterback of the company's expansion strategy". From 1972 to 1985, the company's net worth increased from $8 million to $767 million. Seven years after Bainum introduced its mergers and acquisitions plan, Manor Care annual revenues increased from $31 million in 1976 to about $500 million.

Bainum led an unsolicited tender offer for Hillhaven Corporation in 1979. Manor Care, a company with a net worth of about $10 million in the late 1970s, gained ownership of 55 percent of Hillhaven's common stock, and sold it a year later making $5 million. Bainum led Manor Care's acquisition of Quality Inns, Inc., in 1980. In 1981, Manor Care acquired Cenco, a private-pay nursing home chain, tripling its size.

By 1983, Manor Care became the United States' second-largest nursing home company. Bainum took over for his father, becoming chairman and CEO in 1987. With Bainum as chairman and CEO, the company spent $280 million to build 39 nursing homes over four years from the late 1980s into the 1990s. Bainum brought in executives from Marriott and The Walt Disney Company, including Disney's Chuck Shields, to bolster management, develop new human resources strategies and redesign compensation packages. Bainum instituted programs to reduce turnover of nursing care facility administrators and expanded Manor Care's subacute care facilities in the 1990s to take advantage of a trend in "dehospitalization".

The Washington Business Journal credited Bainum with "turning the low-key company into a billion-dollar enterprise" and the hotels division, which became known as Choice Hotels, became the world's second-largest hotel franchisor. Of the 209 largest family influenced, publicly held companies from 1976 to 1996, the Bainums' Manor Care generated the second-highest average annual shareholder returns, second behind Warren Buffett's Berkshire Hathaway. The company spun off its hotels business in 1996. As of 2017, Bainum remains chairman of Choice Hotels.

Bainum joined the leadership team of Quality Inns, which later became Choice Hotels, in 1977. Since then, the company has grown from 240 Quality Inn hotels to more than 6,500 properties under 11 hotel brands in more than 40 countries.

George Washington University's School of Business and Public Management named Bainum CEO of the year in 1997, citing the company's annual revenue growth from $500 million to 2.4 billion under his leadership. In 1998, Manor Care merged with Healthcare and Retirement Corporation to create a company with a combined value of $4 billion. Bainum was chairman of HRC Manor Care until 2001 and left the board in 2002.

As of March 2017, Bainum is the manager of Artis Senior Living and is on the advisory board for SunBridge Capital Management, LLC. Bainum has also held leadership posts with Vitalink Pharmacy Services and Sunburst Hospitality.

In 2019, Bainum received a Lifetime Achievement Award for his work in hospitality, from the Americas Lodging Investment Summit. The following year, he received the 2020 John E. Anderson Distinguished Alumni Award from UCLA Anderson School of Management.

=== Politics ===
Stewart W. Bainum Jr.

Maryland House of Delegates
- In office 1979–1983

Maryland Senate
- In office 1983–1987

Bainum, who was described by Forbes as a "fiscal-minded Democrat", served for eight years in the Maryland General Assembly.

Bainum first ran for elected office in 1974, when he sought to unseat incumbent Maryland state Senator Victor Crawford. The Maryland Court of Appeals ruled that Bainum was ineligible to run, as he did not meet the state's residency requirements at the time.

In 1978, he was elected to the Maryland House of Delegates, a post he held until 1982, serving on the Ways and Means Committee and as chairman of its Transportation Subcommittee. In 1982, Bainum ran successfully for state senator. He served as state senator of Maryland's 20th District from 1983 to 1986, serving on the Budget and Taxation Committee, the Joint Committee on Budget and Audit, the Subcommittee on Corrections and Transportation, and the Capital Budget Subcommittee.

Bainum is known for his efforts to end special tax breaks for private clubs, such as the all-male Burning Tree Club in Bethesda, Maryland. Bainum and his sister, Barbara Bainum, filed a lawsuit against the club. In 1984, as a result of the lawsuit, a Montgomery County, Maryland, judge ruled that Burning Tree must give up its $186,000 yearly real estate tax exemption if it does not allow women. In 1986, legislation he sponsored that barred private clubs that exclude women from receiving state tax breaks became law. This effort earned him "the hostility of Washington's politico-golfing community". Bainum also sponsored a child support bill to require employers to deduct court-ordered payments, similar to how taxes are deducted, as well as legislation requiring public officials to disclose withdrawals from failed savings and loans, increase penalties for illegal handgun use, make information public on toxic substances and hazardous waste, increase fees on heavy trucks to offset road repair costs, and tax relief for low-income tenants.

He received awards from Common Cause and environmental advocates.

Bainum ran for Maryland's 8th congressional district in 1986 when the seat became open. He won his party's primary but lost in the general election to Republican Constance A. Morella.

Bainum was a supporter, 2008 Democratic National Convention delegate and fundraiser for President Barack Obama. He endorsed Hillary Clinton in the 2016 U.S. presidential election.

== Philanthropy ==
In 2018, Bainum and his wife committed to The Giving Pledge, a campaign to encourage wealthy people to contribute a majority of their wealth to philanthropic causes.

In February 2021, it was announced that Bainum was seeking to acquire The Baltimore Sun, whose parent company was being acquired by Alden Global Capital. His bid was in response to the "Save Our Sun" campaign launched by some of The Sun's staff to find a local owner to turn the paper into a non-profit. After he was unsuccessful in this effort, he committed $200 million of his own money to compete with Alden to acquire all of Tribune Publishing Company, with the goal of finding "responsible buyers" for each of the Tribune-owned publications. Bainum was unable to find a buyer for the Chicago Tribune and the effort failed. He then formed the Venetoulis Institute for Local Journalism with his family, as a non-profit organization focused on local Baltimore news and statewide news in Maryland. He is the chairman of the Institute, which was named after former Baltimore County executive Ted Venetoulis, an advocate for local news who died in 2021. In October 2021, he announced that he had established an online non-profit news outlet, named The Baltimore Banner. The Banner is overseen by the Venetoulis Institute and initially supported by donations. Inside Philanthropy named Bainum as the "Journalism Hero of the Year Who Wasn’t (and Then Was)" in its 2021 Philanthropy Awards. On April 14, 2026, Venetoulis acquired the Pittsburgh Post-Gazette.

== Personal life ==
Bainum is married and has two children. Bainum first saw his wife, Sandy, while attending a play at the National Theatre, where she played the role of Annie in 42nd Street. Bainum called the theater to introduce himself to Sandy and they began dating shortly after.

Bainum is a member of UCLA's Anderson School of Management's Board of Advisors. He has served on the boards of trustees for University of Maryland Medical System, St. Mary's College of Maryland, Baltimore Symphony Orchestra, Johns Hopkins University and Bowdoin College. He was an honorary co-chair of Marylanders Against Handgun Use. In 2008, Bainum helped fund and unsuccessfully advocated against a 2008 referendum that legalized slot machines in Maryland.
