= Assisted living =

Housing facility for people with disabilities

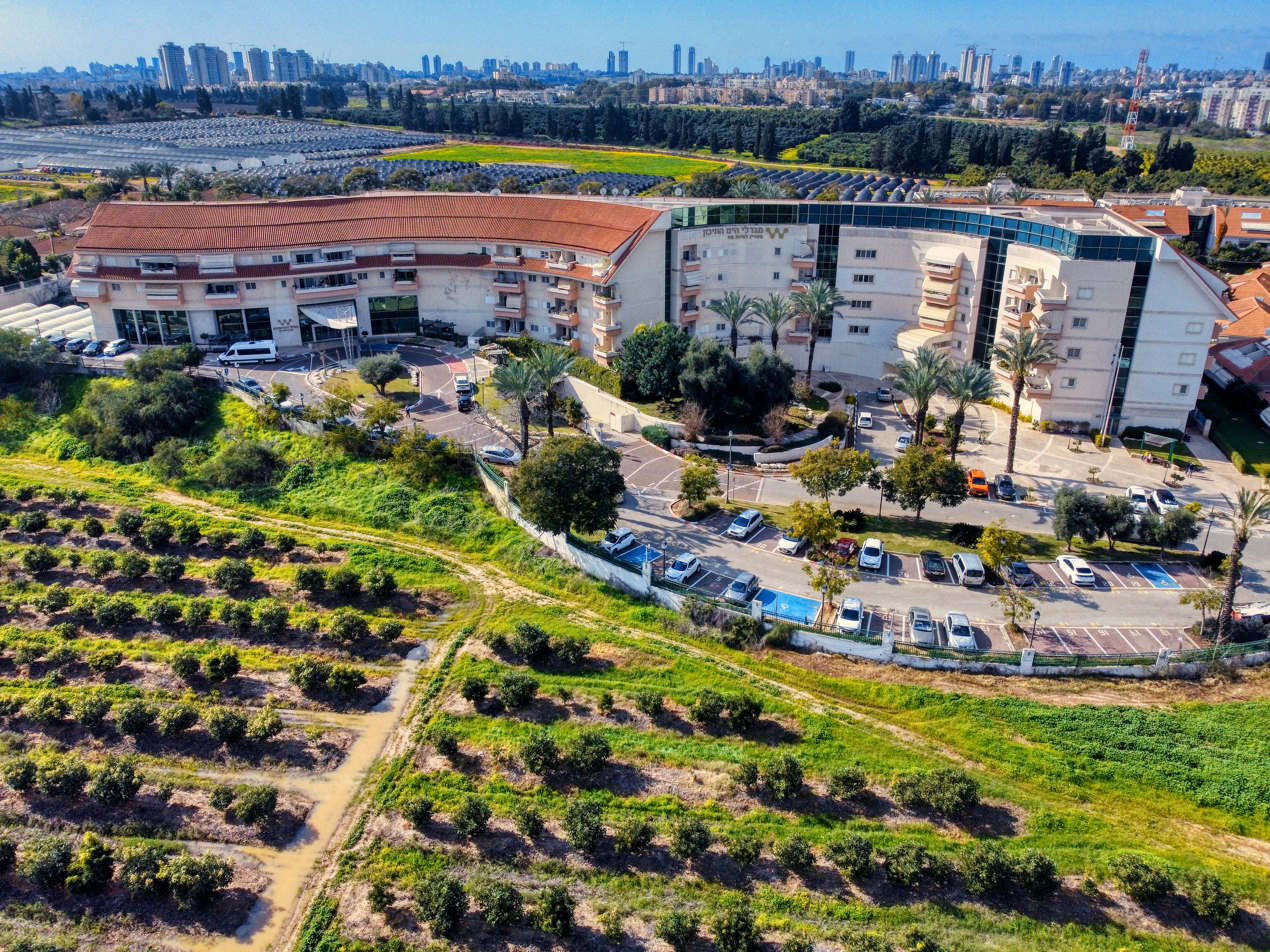
Assisted living facility in Israel

An assisted living residence or assisted living facility (ALF) is a housing facility for people with disabilities or for adults who cannot or who choose not to live independently. The term is popular in the United States. Still, the setting is similar to a retirement home, in the sense that facilities provide a group living environment and typically cater to an older adult population. There is also Caribbean assisted living, which offers a similar service in a resort-like environment (somewhat like assisted vacationing). The expansion of assisted living has been the shift from "care as service" to "care as business" in the broader health care system predicted in 1982. A consumer-driven industry, assisted living offers a wide range of options, levels of care, and diversity of services (Lockhart, 2009) and is subject to state rather than federal regulatory oversight.

What "Assisted living" means depends on both the state and provider in question: variations in state regulatory definitions are significant and provider variables include everything from philosophy, geographic location and auspice, to organizational size and structure. Assisted living evolved from small "board and care" or "personal care" homes and offers a "social model" of care (compared to the medical model of a skilled nursing facility). The assisted living industry is a segment of the senior housing industry. Assisted living services can be delivered in stand-alone facilities or as part of a multi-level senior living community. The industry is fragmented and dominated by for-profit providers. In 2010, six of the seventy largest providers were non-profit, and none of the top twenty were non-profit (Martin, 2010). Information in this edit is from an article published in 2012 that reviewed the industry and reports results of a research study of assisted living facilities.

In 2012, the U.S. Government estimated that there were 22,200 assisted living facilities in the U.S. (compared to 15,700 nursing homes) and that 713,300 people were residents of these facilities. The number of assisted living facilities in the U.S. has increased dramatically since the early 2000s. In the U.S., ALFs can be owned by for-profit companies (publicly traded companies or limited liability companies [LLCs]), non-profit organizations, or governments. These facilities typically provide supervision or assistance with activities of daily living (ADLs); coordination of services by outside health care providers; and monitoring of resident activities to help to ensure their health, safety, and well-being. Assistance often includes administering or supervising medication or personal care services. There has been controversy generated by reports of neglect, abuse, and mistreatment of residents at assisted living facilities in the U.S.

== Canada ==
Canada has differences in how assisted living is understood from one province to the next. In most provinces, the phrase is understood as less independent than in the United States. People often require help with more than one of the activities of daily living or the more intensive ADLs like feeding or bathing. In the province of Alberta, "supportive living" is the distinct phrasing used for a type of care that is otherwise synonymous. The province's Supportive Living Accommodation Licensing Act is a comprehensive act with specific prescriptions governing care homes licensing, inspections, and more.

== United States ==
Within the United States assisted living spectrum, there is no nationally recognized definition of assisted living. Assisted living facilities are regulated and licensed at the US state level. These regulations include staffing, training, and quality and safety standards. This is differentiated from nursing homes, which are regulated on a federal level and are generally held to more stringent standards. More than two-thirds of the states use the licensure term "assisted living". Other licensure terms used for this philosophy of care include residential care homes, assisted care living facilities, and personal care homes. Each state licensing agency has its definition of the term it uses to describe assisted living. Because the term assisted living has not been defined in some states, it is often a marketing term used by various senior living communities, licensed or unlicensed. In Florida, for example, Adult Family Care Homes are limited to a maximum of five residents, while Assisted Living Facilities must have at least six and can have hundreds. Assisted living facilities in the United States had a national median monthly rate of $3,500.00 in 2014, a 1.45% increase over 2013 and a 4.29% increase over five years from 2009 to 2014.

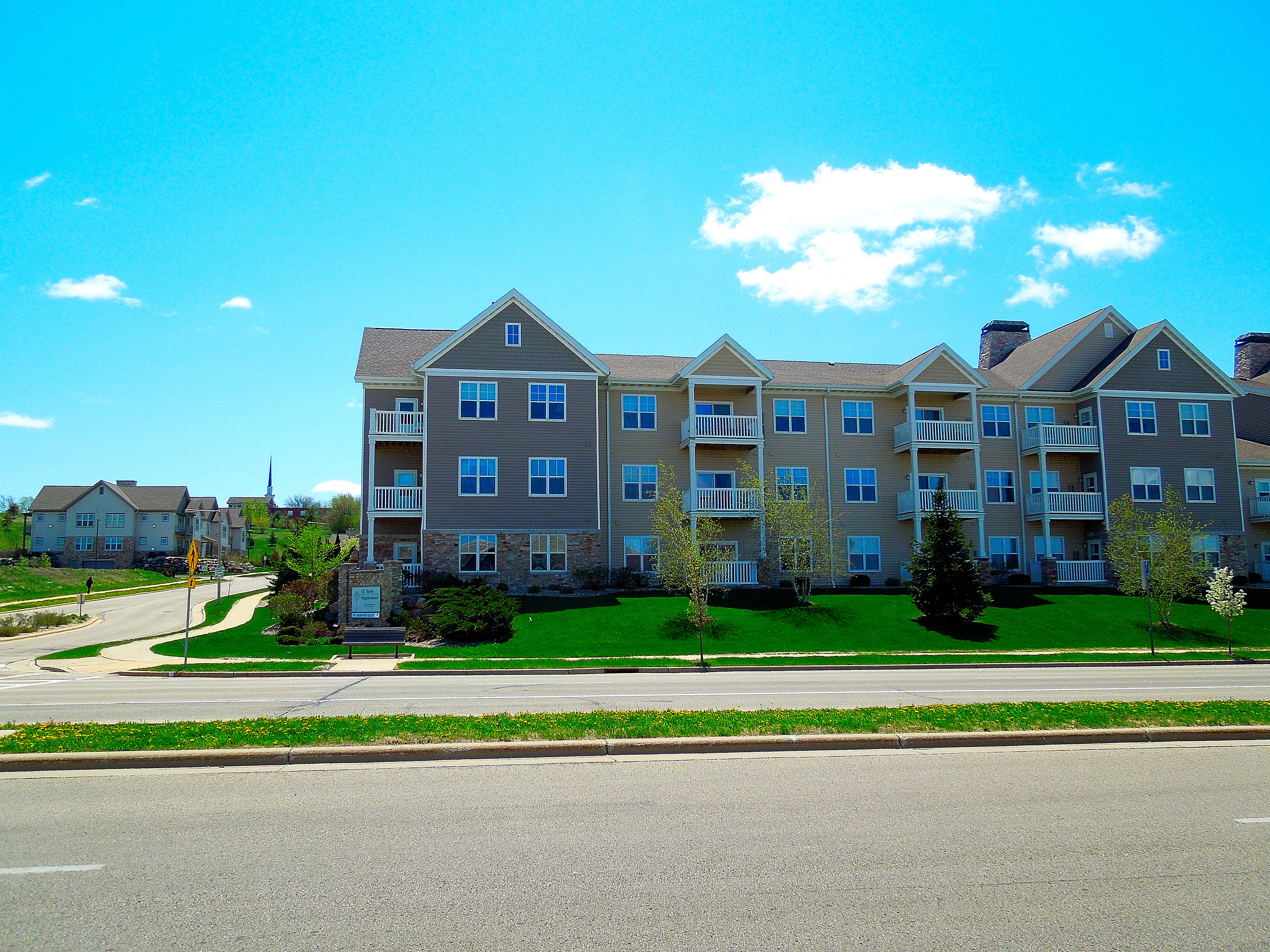
Assisted Living Facility in Wisconsin

=== Types ===
As widely varied as the state licensing and definitions are, so are the types of physical layouts of buildings in which assisted living services are provided. A resident can have an apartment, condo, private room, or shared room. Some facilities offer furnished rooms. All residents will have access to a kitchen which may be personal or shared depending on the facility chosen. The average assisted living facility is in a commercial building, yet some assisted living services use large residential buildings, known as Residential Assisted Living homes, or "RAL". Residential Assisted Living homes can vary in price and amenities and can even be grouped into a separate term known as a Luxury Residential Assisted Living Home, or "LRAL". Assisted living facilities can range from a small residential house for one resident to extensive facilities providing services to hundreds of residents. Assisted living falls somewhere between an independent living community and a skilled nursing facility regarding the level of care provided. Continuing care retirement facilities combine independent living, assisted living, and nursing care in one facility.

People living in newer assisted living facilities usually have private apartments. There is usually no special medical monitoring equipment that one would find in a nursing home, and their nursing staff may only be available at some hours. However, trained staff are usually on-site around the clock to provide other needed services. Household chores are performed: sheets are changed, laundry is done, and food is cooked and served as part of the base rent and included services. Depending on their disclosure of services, assisted living services may include medication management, bathing assistance, dressing, escorts to meals and activities, toileting, transferring, and insulin injections by an RN. Some assisted living providers also offer amenities like exercise rooms or a beauty parlor on site. Grocery service is often available, too. Where provided, private apartments generally are self-contained; i.e., they have their own bedroom and bathroom and may have a separate living area or small kitchen. Registered nurses and licensed practical nurses are available by phone or e-mail 24 hours a day to ensure proper teaching and/or education of staff is available.

Alternatively, individual living spaces may resemble a dormitory or hotel room with a private or semi-private sleeping area and a shared bathroom. There are usually common areas for socializing, as well as a central kitchen and dining room for preparing and eating meals. Since assisted living facilities are not federally regulated they follow the States Fair Housing Act. Several of the assisted living residents are not familiar or do not understand this act. Legal advocates and long term care ombudsman can be utilized to ensure residents are getting the best care possible based on this act. This information should be communicated to all residents to ensure there is no discrimination in the facility.

=== Typical resident ===
An assisted living resident is a resident who needs assistance with at least one of the activities of daily living. A typical assisted living facility resident would usually be an older adult who does not need the level of care offered by a nursing home but prefers more companionship and needs some assistance in day-to-day living. Age groups will vary with every facility. There is currently a transformation occurring in long-term care. Assisted living communities are accepting higher and higher levels of care, and nursing homes are becoming a place for those undergoing rehabilitation after a hospital stay or needing extensive assistance. Many assisted living communities now accept individuals who need help with all activities of daily living. The "Overview of Assisted Living Report" from 2010 stated that 54 percent of assisted living residents are 85 years or older; 27 percent are 75–84 years old; 9 percent of residents are between 65 and 74 years; and 11 percent are younger than 65 years old. 74% of assisted living residents are female; 26 percent are male.

=== Special needs ===
The residence may assist in arranging the appropriate medical, health, and dental care services for each resident. The resident generally chooses their medical doctor and dental services. Residents who have periods of temporary incapacity due to illness, injury, or recovery from surgery often choose assisted living as a supportive option to help them recover quickly so they can return home. In the case of these short-term respite stays, assisted living residences act as the bridge between hospital and home. Short-term respite stays in assisted living are also an option for families when the primary caregiver goes out of town or cannot provide the needed care.

More recently built facilities are designed to emphasize ease of use for disabled people. Bathrooms and kitchens are designed with wheelchairs and walkers in mind. Hallways and doors are extra-wide to accommodate wheelchairs. These facilities are by necessity fully compliant with the Americans with Disabilities Act of 1990 (ADA) or similar legislation elsewhere. A study was done on how much functional assistance residents need on a day to day basis. The results are as follows, 77% of residents need assistance with bathing. 69% of residents need assistance with walking. 61% of residents need help with dressing. 51% of residents need assistance getting out of bed. 48% of residents need assistance toileting. 26% of residents need assistance eating. The socialization aspects of ALFs are very beneficial to the occupants. Usually, the facility has many activities scheduled for the occupants, keeping in mind different disabilities and needs.

=== Interaction ===
The shift to an acute care facility frequently results in a disturbance to the typical social routines of older individuals. This disruption can intensify the decline in their social connections and autonomy, amplifying feelings of loneliness and isolation. Maintaining connections within social networks is crucial for individuals residing in assisted living facilities, and it plays a vital role in reinforcing their sense of identity. Facilities typically provide both organizational and environmental factors. A study found a variety of scheduled group recreational activities such as arts and crafts, culture clubs, yoga, music therapy, prayer, and spiritual reminiscence, were offered. Additionally, the facilities in this investigation were designed with open-plan layouts, outdoor gardens, and easily accessible areas for gatherings, potentially fostering engagement and interactions among residents.

=== Locked units ===
Many ALFs also serve the needs of people with some form of dementia, including Alzheimer's disease and others with mental disabilities, as long as they do not present an imminent danger to themselves or others. The sections of the building where these residents live are often referred to as memory care. In the United States, legislation enacted by each state defines not only the level of care, but often what conditions are prohibited from being cared for in such a home. In California, these units are not "locked" they are secured by alarms, delays, keypads needing a code, etc. However, they are not locked units like a psychiatric ward.

Many ALFs will work to accommodate a person with severe forms of Alzheimer's by having separate private units. These specialized care areas are part of the main building but are secured so residents with Alzheimer's cannot leave and possibly do harm to themselves. These care areas usually house fewer people, and more attention from the caregivers is provided. The units, usually called locked units, focus on applying cognitive and mental activities to help keep the mind fresh. Since there is no cure for the disease, the goal is to work at prolonging or delaying the illness. If one is not engaged in an activity, one's memory will deteriorate more rapidly.

=== Cost increases ===
Assisted living facilities, initially established to support older Americans in their later years, have become increasingly focused on maximizing financial gains at the expense of their residents' well-being. Over the period from 2004 to 2021, the median annual cost of assisted living has outpaced inflation by 31%, increasing to $54,000 per year. There are approximately 31,000 assisted living facilities in the United States, with four out of five operated for-profit. Half of all operators within the industry are achieving annual returns of 20% or more, exceeding operating costs by a substantial margin. These exceedingly high-profit margins are unprecedented even within other healthcare industry sectors.

Assisted Living Facilities have the option to offer Medicare- and Medicaid-covered services, such as home health or personal care, to their residents. These services are similar to what individuals would typically receive in a private residence. ALF providers aiming for Medicare or Medicaid reimbursement for home health services need to comply with federal home health agency standards. ALFs can enter into contracts with Medicare or Medicaid providers to deliver covered home health, personal care, and other specified LTSS within their facilities for participating residents. With an estimated 850,000 older Americans residing in assisted living facilities, the higher rents and the increasingly prevalent ancillary fees pose a significant housing and healthcare challenge for an elderly demographic that often struggles to address their needs.

=== Ongoing Issues ===
Instances of mistreatment, encompassing physical, sexual, verbal, psychological, emotional abuse, neglect, and financial exploitation, may manifest within an Assisted Living facility. Such mistreatment is characterized by the deliberate ill-treatment of a resident and can be perpetrated by the facility itself, fellow residents, or an external party with access to the resident's personal information. A study conducted to evaluate these concerns in the Assisted Living community revealed that verbal and physical abuse emerged as the primary category, with 28% of residents reporting experiences of abuse.

==== 2011 Miami Herald investigation ====
A Miami Herald article covering the newspaper's 2011 investigation into assisted living facilities in Florida was nominated as a finalist for the Pulitzer Prize. The newspaper's investigation found that:

1. "The safeguards once hailed as the most progressive in the nation have been ignored in a string of tragedies never before revealed to the public,..."
2. "That the Agency for Health Care Administration, which oversees the state's 2,850 assisted-living facilities, has failed to monitor shoddy operators, investigate dangerous practices or shut down the worst offenders", and
3. "As the ranks of assisted-living facilities grew to make room for Florida's booming elderly population, the state failed to protect the people it was meant to serve."

The investigation found dozens of incidents of gross mismanagement and criminal behavior at assisted living facilities across Florida, a state of 20 million people, popular with American retirees. The newspaper requested the release of state documents related to the deaths of over 300 people in assisted living facilities between 2003 and 2011 but was denied these documents. Still, the newspaper's investigation found no less than 70 people who had died due to the "actions of their caregivers". The deaths were found to have resulted from the mismanagement of assisted living facilities and by the practices of their staff and managers who drugged residents, deprived them of basic necessities such as food and water, abused residents verbally, psychologically and physically, and neglecting their needs.

Long-term care ombudsmen, whether volunteering or employed independently, function outside the scope of Assisted Living Facilities. They actively support and defend the well-being and rights of residents within these environments. Ombudsmen conduct regular, surprise visits to these facilities, where they observe conditions, listen to resident concerns, and strive to resolve issues on the residents' behalf. Beyond addressing complaints, they empower residents by providing information on their rights and options, considering the impact on their quality of life. Mandated by the Older Americans Act, ombudsman services are directed by residents, confidential, and offered free of charge. These advocates also work towards policy changes that enhance the overall well-being of individuals in long-term care settings. Needs of residents being addressed can be as small as a change in the lunch menu or needing a new pair of glasses. 60%- 70% of the residents do not have family to ensure they are being well cared for. However, there is a large need for ombudsmen in the assisted living facility community.

==== 2013 Frontline investigation ====
On July 30, 2013 Frontline ran an hour-long program with help from ProPublica detailing some tragedies that happened in assisted living. Currently, around 750,000 people inhabit assisted living facilities nationwide. The industry is largely controlled by for-profit chains with a focus on both resident care and shareholder satisfaction. There are disparities in care standards, training, and the definition of 'assisted living' across different states. Unlike nursing homes, assisted living facilities operate without federal regulation An accompanying written brief cites deaths of residents, facilities that are understaffed, employees that are inadequately trained, and that an overall "push to fill facilities and maximize revenues has left staff overwhelmed and the care of residents endangered".

A related article by ProPublica (Thomson and Jones, July 29, 2013) states that a facility operated by Emeritus Senior Living "...had been found wanting in almost every important regard. And, in truth, those 'specially trained' staffers hadn't been trained to care for people with Alzheimer's and other forms of dementia, a violation of California law." It goes on to say, "The facility relied on a single nurse to track the health of its scores of residents, and the few licensed medical professionals who worked there tended not to last long," but also that "During some stretches, the facility went months without a full-time nurse on the payroll." ProPublica's article claimed the problem was not specific to one facility and that "State inspectors for years had cited Emeritus facilities across California". Emeritus replied to that claim, describing "any shortcomings as isolated," as well as that "any problems that arise are promptly addressed". The company cited their "growing popularity as evidence of consumer satisfaction".

=== Comparison between assisted living and personal care ===
In Pennsylvania, personal care and assisted living are defined separately. Personal care and assisted living in PA are regulated by the Pennsylvania Bureau of Human Services Licensing (a division of the Department of Human Services). Up until January 2011, the terms "assisted living" and "personal care" were considered interchangeable. At that time, Pennsylvania began licensing assisted living facilities separately from personal care facilities. Chapter 2800 of the 55 Pennsylvania Code defines assisted living as "a significant long-term care alternative to allow individuals to age in place", where residents "will receive the assistance they need to age in place and develop and maintain maximum independence, exercise decision-making and personal choice".

Likewise, Chapter 2600 of the 55 Pa. Code defines personal care as "A premise in which food, shelter and personal assistance or supervision are provided for a period exceeding 24 hours, for four or more adults who are not relatives of the operator, who do not require the services in or of a licensed long-term care facility, but who do require assistance or supervision in activities of daily living or instrumental activities of daily living". The differences between the two levels of care are broken down into three categories:

- Concept – Assisted living residences permit residents to age in place, meaning that even as their health care needs increase, they will not have to relocate to another senior living home to receive that care, such as skilled nursing.
- Construction – Assisted living residences must provide residents with a private room with a lockable door, a private bathroom, and a small kitchen. Personal care homes are not required to offer these amenities.
- Level of Care – Assisted living residences must ensure that residents receive skilled nursing care if their needs surpass standard assisted living services.

== United Kingdom ==
Assisted living is known as extra-care housing or retirement living, allowing residents over 55 or 60 to live independently. They are offered a self-contained flat or bungalow and have staff available 24 hours a day to provide personal care. Staff help wash, dress residents, take medication, and do domestic duties such as shopping and laundry; they also prepare and serve meals to residents if provided. Residents are often asked whether to own or rent their properties independently; the average cost ranges from £500 to £1,500, depending on where the resident lives. Assisted living accommodations often include a scheme manager or team of onsite support staff, nurses, and care staff, 24-hour emergency alarm systems, and communal lounges to socialise with other residents. Assisted living housing is regulated by the Care Quality Commission (CQC).

== See also ==
- Aging in place
- Assistive technology
- Eldercare
- Food preferences in older adults and seniors
- Group home
- Retirement community
- Retirement home
- Transgenerational design
