= List of private equity firms =

Below is a list of notable private equity firms.

== Largest private equity firms by PE capital raised ==
Each year Private Equity International publishes the PEI 300, a ranking of the largest private-equity firms by how much capital they have raised for private-equity investment in the last five years.

In the 2026 ranking, there were no changes to the top three, with KKR retaining the top spot from EQT AB and Blackstone Inc..

2026 PEI 300 rank	Firm	Headquarters	Five-year fundraising total ($m)
1	KKR	(United States) New York City	140,363
2	EQT AB	(Sweden) Stockholm	134,393
3	Blackstone	(United States) New York City	111,797
4	TPG	(United States) San Francisco	88,163
5	Thoma Bravo	(United States) Chicago	71,855
6	Hg	(United Kingdom) London	70,245
7	Bain Capital	(United States) Boston	60,367
8	General Atlantic	(United States) New York City	59,496
9	Advent International	(United States) Boston	59,280
10	Goldman Sachs Alternatives	(United States) New York City	58,661
11	Clayton, Dubilier & Rice	(United States) New York City	49,536
12	CVC Capital Partners	Luxembourg; France	49,471
13	Hellman & Friedman	(United States) San Francisco	49,006
14	Warburg Pincus	(United States) New York City	48,350
15	Clearlake Capital Group	(United States) Santa Monica, California	42,450
16	Andreessen Horowitz	(United States) Menlo Park, California	42,072
17	Insight Partners	(United States) New York City	38,621
18	Leonard Green & Partners	(United States) Los Angeles	38,357
19	HarbourVest Partners	(United States) Boston	36,811
20	Vista Equity Partners	(United States) Austin, Texas	34,330
21	Veritas Capital	(United States) New York	33,063
22	The Carlyle Group	(United States) Washington D.C.	31,410
23	Apollo Global Management	(United States) New York	31,348
24	TA Associates	(United States) Boston	30,500
25	Stone Point Capital	(United States) Greenwich, Connecticut	30,109
26	Neuberger Berman Private Markets	(United States) New York	29,615
27	Blue Owl Capital	(United States) New York	29,455
28	Silver Lake	(United States) Menlo Park, California	29,450
29	Partners Group	(Switzerland) Baar	28,536
30	Sequoia Capital	(United States) Menlo Park, California	28,267

== List of investment banking private equity groups ==
Parent bank	Private equity firm	Location	Year founded	Year independent
ABN AMRO	AAC Capital Partners	(Netherlands) Amsterdam	-	2008
AXA	Ardian	(France) Paris	1996	2013
Bank of America	Ridgemont Equity Partners	(United States) Charlotte	1993	2010
Barclays Capital	BGF (Business Growth Fund) Equistone Partners Europ	(United Kingdom) London (United Kingdom) London	2011 1979	2011 2011
Barings Bank ^	Baring Vostok Capital Partners; Baring Private Equity Asia	(Russia) Moscow; Hong Kong	1994; 1997	2004; 2000
Bear Stearns ^	KKR; Irving Place Capital (fka BSMB)	(United States) New York (United States) New York	1965; 1997	1976; 2008
BNP Paribas	PAI Partners BNP Paribas Développement	(France) Paris (France) Paris	1993 2016	1998 -
BT Alex. Brown ^	ABS Capital	(United States) Baltimore	1990	1995
CIBC World Markets	Trimaran Capital Partners	(United States) New York	1995	2001
Citigroup	Court Square Capital Partners; CVC Capital Partners; Welsh, Carson, Anderson & Stowe; Bruckmann, Rosser, Sherrill & Co.	(United States) New York; Luxembourg; France (United States) New York (United States) New York	1968; 1981; 1979; 1995	2006; 1993; 1979; 1995
Crédit Agricole / LCL	Omnes Capital	(France) Paris	1999	2011
Credit Suisse / Donaldson, Lufkin & Jenrette ^	DLJ Merchant Banking; Avista Capital Partners; Diamond Castle Holdings; Castle Harlan; CIP Capital	(United States) New York (United States) New York (United States) New York (United States) New York (United States) New York	1985; 1985; 1985; 1987; 2010	na 2005; 2004; 1987; 2010
Continental Illinois ^	Willis Stein & Partners; CIVC Partners	(United States) Chicago (United States) Chicago	1983; 1983	1995; 1994
Deutsche Bank	MidOcean Partners	(United States) New York	2003	2003
First Chicago Bank ^	Madison Dearborn Partners; GTCR	(United States) Chicago (United States) Chicago	1992; 1980	1992; 1980
Goldman Sachs	Goldman Sachs Alternatives	(United States) New York	1986	na
HSBC	BGF (Business Growth Fund)	(United Kingdom) London	2011	2022
JPMorgan Chase & Co.	CCMP Capital (fka JPMorgan Partners); HPS Investment Partners; One Equity Partners	(United States) New York (United States) New York (United States) Chicago	1984; 2007; 2001	2006; 2016 na
Lazard	Lazard Alternative Investments	(United States) New York	-	-
Lehman Brothers ^	Blackstone; The Cypress Group; Trilantic Capital Partners	(United States) New York (United States) New York (United States) New York	1985; 1994; 1986	1985; 1994; 2009
Lloyds Banking Group	BGF (Business Growth Fund) Lloyds Development Capital	(United Kingdom) London (United Kingdom) London	2011 1981	2011 na
Macquarie Group	Macquarie Infrastructure and Real Assets	(Australia) Sydney	1994	na
Merrill Lynch	Merrill Lynch Global Private Equity	(United States) New York	1996	na
Morgan Stanley	Metalmark Capital; Morgan Stanley Capital Partners	(United States) New York (United States) New York	1985	2004
National Westminster Bank	Bridgepoint Capital	(United Kingdom) London	1984	2000
Nomura Group	Terra Firma Capital Partners	(United Kingdom) London	1994	2002
Rothschild & Co	Five Arrows Principal Investments Five Arrows Capital Partners	(France) Paris (United States) New York	2010 2018	- -
Standard Chartered	BGF (Business Growth Fund)	(United Kingdom) London	2011	2011
Société Générale	Société Générale Capital Partenaires	(France) Paris	1973	-
UBS	UBS Capital; Affinity Equity Partners; Capvis; Lightyear Capital	(United Kingdom) London; Hong Kong (Switzerland) Zurich (United States) New York	- 1995; 1990; 2000	na 2002; 2003; 2002
Wells Fargo	Pamlico Capital	(United States) Charlotte	1988	2010
William Blair & Company	William Blair Capital Partners	(United States) Chicago	1982	2004

^ Defunct banking institution

== Notable private equity firms ==
=== Americas ===
- (United States) 3G Capital
- (United States) ABS Capital
- (United States) Adams Street Partners
- (United States) Advent International
- (United States) AEA Investors
- (United States) American Securities
- (United States) Angelo, Gordon & Co.
- (United States) Apollo Global Management
- (United States) Ares Management
- (United States) Arlington Capital Partners
- (United States) Auldbrass Partners
- (United States) Avenue Capital Group
- (United States) Avista Capital Partners
- (United States) Bain Capital
- (United States) BDT & MSD Partners
- (United States) Berkshire Partners
- (United States) Blackstone
- (United States) Blue Owl Capital
- (United States) Blum Capital
- (United States) Brentwood Associates
- (United States) Bruckmann, Rosser, Sherrill & Co.
- (United States) Brynwood Partners
- (United States) CapitalG
- (United States) Carlyle Group
- (United States) Castle Harlan
- (United States) CCMP Capital
- (United States) Centerbridge Partners
- (United States) Cerberus Capital Management
- (United States) Charlesbank Capital Partners
- (United States) Chicago Growth Partners
- (United States) CIVC Partners
- (United States) Clayton, Dubilier & Rice
- (United States) Clearlake Capital
- (United States) Colony Capital
- (United States) Court Square Capital Partners
- (United States) Crescent Capital Group
- (United States) CrossHarbor Capital Partners
- (United States) Crossroads Group
- (United States) Cypress Group
- (United States) Defoe Fournier & Cie.
- (United States) Diamond Castle Holdings
- (United States) DLJ Merchant Banking Partners
- (United States) EIG Global Energy Partners
- (United States) Elevation Partners
- (United States) EnCap Investments
- (United States) Energy Capital Partners
- (United States) Fenway Partners
- (United States) First Reserve Corporation
- (United States) Forstmann Little & Company
- (United States) Fortress Investment Group
- (United States) Fox Paine & Company
- (United States) Francisco Partners
- (United States) Freeman Spogli & Co.
- (United States) Fremont Group
- (United States) Friedman Fleischer & Lowe
- (United States) Frontenac Company
- (United States) General Atlantic
- (United States) Genstar Capital
- (United States) GI Partners
- (United States) Golden Gate Capital Partners
- (United States) Goldman Sachs Alternatives
- (United States) Gores Group
- (Brazil) GP Investimentos
- (United States) GTCR
- (United States) H.I.G. Capital
- (United States) Hamilton Lane
- (United States) Harbert Management Corporation
- (United States) HarbourVest Partners
- (United States) Harvest Partners
- (United States) Heartland Industrial Partners
- (United States) Hellman & Friedman
- (United States) Highbridge Capital Management
- (United States) Highland Capital Management
- (United States) HM Capital Partners
- (United States) HPS Investment Partners
- (United States) InterMedia Partners
- (United States) Irving Place Capital
- (United States) J.H. Whitney & Company
- (United States) J.W. Childs Associates
- (United States) JC Flowers
- (United States) JLL Partners
- (United States) Jordan Company
- (United States) Kelso & Company
- (United States) Khosla Ventures
- (United States) Kinderhook Industries
- (United States) KKR
- (United States) Kleiner Perkins
- (United States) Kohlberg & Company
- (United States) KPS Capital Partners
- (United States) L Catterton
- (United States) Landmark Partners
- (United States) Lee Equity Partners
- (United States) Leeds Equity Partners
- (United States) Leonard Green & Partners
- (United States) Lexington Partners
- (United States) Lightyear Capital
- (United States) Lincolnshire Management
- (United States) Lindsay Goldberg Bessemer
- (United States) Littlejohn & Co.
- (United States) Lone Star Funds
- (United States) Lovell Minnick Partners
- (United States) LRG Capital Funds
- (United States) Lux Capital
- (United States) Madison Dearborn Partners
- (United States) MatlinPatterson Global Advisors
- (United States) Metalmark Capital
- (United States) MidOcean Partners
- (United States) Morgan Stanley Private Equity
- (United States) New Mountain Capital
- (United States) NRDC Equity Partners
- (United States) Oak Hill Capital Partners
- (United States) Oak Investment Partners
- (United States) Olympus Partners
- (United States) One Equity Partners
- (Canada) Onex Corporation
- (United States) Pamlico Capital
- (United States) Pathway Capital Management
- (United States) Platinum Equity
- (United States) Providence Equity Partners
- (United States) Quadrangle Group
- (United States) Redpoint Ventures
- (United States) Rhône Group
- (United States) Ripplewood Holdings
- (United States) Riverside Partners
- (United States) Riverstone Holdings
- (United States) Roark Capital Group
- (United States) RPX Corporation
- (United States) Sentinel Capital Partners
- (United States) Silver Lake Partners
- (United States) Stonepeak
- (United States) Summit Partners
- (United States) Sun Capital Partners
- (United States) Sycamore Partners
- (United States) Symphony Technology Group
- (United States) TA Associates
- (United States) Tavistock Group
- (United States) TCV
- (United States) Thayer Hidden Creek
- (United States) Thoma Bravo
- (United States) Thoma Cressey Bravo
- (United States) Thomas H. Lee Partners
- (United States) Tiger Global Management
- (United States) TowerBrook Capital Partners
- (United States) TPG Capital
- (United States) Trilantic Capital Partners
- (United States) Trivest
- (United States) TSG Consumer Partners
- (United States) Värde Partners
- (United States) Veritas Capital
- (United States) Veronis Suhler Stevenson
- (United States) Vestar Capital Partners
- (United States) Vista Equity Partners
- (United States) Vivo Capital
- (United States) Vulcan Capital Management
- (United States) Warburg Pincus
- (United States) Warwick Energy Group
- (United States) Welsh, Carson, Anderson & Stowe
- (United States) Wesray Capital Corporation
- (United States) Weston Presidio
- (United States) Willis Stein & Partners
- (United States) Wind Point Partners
- (United States) WL Ross & Co.
- (United States) Yucaipa Cos.
- (United States) Zelnick Media Capital

=== Asia ===
- (China) Addor Capital
- (Hong Kong) Affinity Equity Partners
- (Australia) Archer Capital
- (Singapore) Axiom Asia
- (Australia) BGH Capital
- (Hong Kong) Boyu Capital
- (Singapore) CBC Group
- (China) Centurium Capital
- China Chengtong Holdings Group
- China Media Capital
- China Merchants Capital
- China Reform Fund Management
- (China) CITIC Capital
- (China) CoStone Capital
- (China) Cowin Capital
- (China) CPE
- (China) DCP Capital
- (Singapore) Dymon Asia Private Equity
- (Malaysia) Ekuinas
- (Hong Kong) FountainVest Partners
- (Singapore) Hillhouse Capital Group
- (China) Hony Capital
- (China) Hopu Investment Management
- (Japan) JAFCO
- (Japan) JIC Capital
- (Cambodia) Leopard Capital LP
- (Vietnam) Mekong Capital
- (South Korea) MBK Partners
- (Singapore) Northstar Group
- (China) Oriza Holdings
- (Australia) Pacific Equity Partners
- (Hong Kong) PAG
- (Hong Kong) Primavera Capital Group
- (Singapore) Quadria Capital
- (Australia) Quadrant Private Equity
- (Singapore) RRJ Capital
- (Singapore) Seavi Advent
- (China) Tiantu Capital
- (Hong Kong) Tybourne Capital Management
- (China) Yunfeng Capital
- (China) Zhongzhi Capital
- (Hong Kong) ZWC Partners

=== EMEA ===
- (United Kingdom) 3i
- (United Kingdom) Actis
- (Netherlands) AlpInvest Partners
- (Sweden) Altor Equity Partners
- (United Kingdom) Apax Partners
- (Bahrain) Arcapita
- (France) Ardian
- (Norway) Argentum Fondsinvesteringer
- (Denmark) Axcel
- (Germany) Aurelius Group
- (Russia) Baring Vostok Capital Partners
- (United Kingdom) BC Partners
- (United Kingdom) Business Growth Fund
- (Luxembourg) BIP Investment Partners
- (United Kingdom) Bridgepoint Capital
- (France) Butler Capital Partners
- (Finland) CapMan
- (Switzerland) Capital Dynamics
- (Switzerland) Capvis
- (United Kingdom) Charterhouse Capital Partners
- (United Kingdom) Cinven
- (United Kingdom) Close Brothers Group
- (United Kingdom) Coller Capital
- (Luxembourg) Conquest Asset Management
- (Denmark) Copenhagen Infrastructure Partners
- (Denmark) C.W. Obel
- (Luxembourg) CVC Capital Partners
- (United Kingdom) Doughty Hanson & Co
- (Cayman Islands) DST Global
- (Emirate of Dubai) Dubai International Capital
- (United Kingdom) Duke Street Capital
- (South Africa) EMVest Asset Management
- (Sweden) EQT AB
- (France) Eurazeo
- (Norway) Ferd
- (France) Fondinvest Capital
- (Bahrain) GFH Capital
- (Belgium) GIMV
- (United Kingdom) Graphite Capital
- (Switzerland) GK Investment
- (United Kingdom) HgCapital
- (Russia) ICT Group
- (France) Idinvest Partners
- (Russia) IFD Kapital Group
- (United Kingdom) IK Investment Partners
- (Israel) Infinity Group
- (United Kingdom) Intermediate Capital Group
- (Bahrain) Investcorp
- (Saudi Arabia) Jadwa Investment
- (United Kingdom) Kennet Partners
- (Norway) Kistefos
- (Liechtenstein) LGT Capital Partners
- (Denmark) M. Goldschmidt Holding
- (Greece) Marfin Investment Group
- (United Kingdom) MerchantBridge
- (United Kingdom) Meyer Bergman
- (Hungary) Mid Europa Partners
- (Emirate of Abu Dhabi) Mubadala Investment Company
- (Germany) Mutares
- (Sweden) Nordic Capital
- (Norway) Norfund
- (United Kingdom) OpCapita
- (France) PAI Partners
- (United Kingdom) Pantheon Ventures
- (Switzerland) Partners Group
- (United Kingdom) Permira
- (United Kingdom) Phoenix Equity Partners
- (Sweden) Ratos
- (United Kingdom) Silverfleet Capital Partners
- (United Kingdom) SL Capital Partners
- (Belgium) Sofina
- (United Kingdom) SVG Capital
- (United Kingdom) Terra Firma Capital Partners
- (United Kingdom) Unbound Group
- (United Kingdom) Vitruvian Partners

== See also ==
- Private equity
- Private-equity firm
- Private-equity fund
- History of private equity and venture capital
- Sovereign wealth fund
- List of exchange-traded funds

=== Related lists ===
- Private-equity firm articles (Wikipedia category)
- Venture capital firm articles (Wikipedia category)
- Private-equity fund of funds
- List of venture capital firms
- List of real estate investment firms
- Sovereign wealth fund

=== Other lists ===
- List of hedge funds
- List of investment banks
- List of asset management firms
- Boutique investment bank
