= Chicago Growth Partners =

American private equity firm

- Type: Private
- Industry: Private equity
- Founded: 2004 (1982, William Blair Capital Partners)
- Headquarters: Chicago, Illinois, United States
- Products: Leveraged buyout, Growth capital
- Total assets: $1.8 billion
- Website: www.cgp.com

Chicago Growth Partners (formerly known as William Blair Capital Partners) is a private equity firm focused on leveraged buyout and growth capital investments in middle-market companies across a range of industries, including, education, business services, healthcare and industrial growth.

The firm, which is based in Chicago, Illinois, was founded in 2004 although the group traces its roots back to the founding of William Blair Capital Partners in 1982. The Chicago Growth Partners and its predecessor have raised approximately $1.8 billion since inception across nine funds. The team had raised and deployed six funds as the core group behind William Blair Capital Partners. William Blair Capital Partners VII, which closed in 2001 with $403 million was the final fund raised within the William Blair Capital Partners platform.

== History ==
William Blair Capital Partners was founded in 1982 to serve as the investment arm of William Blair & Company. During the 1980s, WBCP was an active investor in leveraged buyout transactions.

William Blair Capital Partners logo

In 2004, the senior partners of William Blair Capital Partners completed a spin out from William Blair to form a new firm, Chicago Growth Partners. The primary motivation for the departure of the Chicago Growth Partners team from William Blair was to gain access to a more diversified base of institutional investors that was limited by the group's involvement with the investment bank.

The spinout of Chicago Growth Partners from William Blair & Company came at the same time as the spinouts of private equity groups from other leading investment banks including: JPMorgan Chase (CCMP Capital), Citigroup (Court Square Capital Partners), Deutsche Bank (MidOcean Partners), Morgan Stanley (Metalmark Capital) and Credit Suisse First Boston (Avista Capital Partners, Diamond Castle Holdings).

In August 2006, the remaining partners of William Blair Capital Partners suspended efforts to raise William Blair Capital Partners VIII, which had been reportedly targeted at about $250 million. The remaining team left William Blair to found two new private equity firms, Seyen Capital and Emerging Market Technology.

In April 2008, Chicago Growth Capital completed fundraising for its second fund as an independent firm with $500 million of investor commitments

Chicago Growth Capital had been in market since late 2012 with plans to raise between $400 million and $500 million for its third fund. In May 2014, Fortune announced that Chicago Growth Partners had abandoned efforts to raise its third fund.
