= Leeds Equity Partners =

American private equity firm

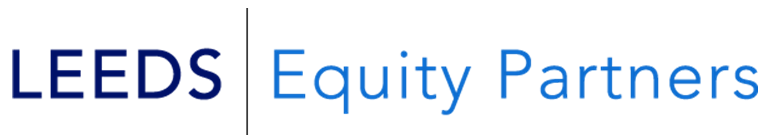
- Type: Private
- Industry: Private equity, Knowledge Industries
- Founded: 1993; 33 years ago
- Founder: Jeffrey T. Leeds; Robert A. Bernstein
- Headquarters: New York, New York, United States
- Products: Leveraged buyout, growth capital
- AUM: $7.0 billion
- Number of employees: 40
- Website: leedsequity.com

Leeds Equity Partners is a private equity firm focused on investments in the Knowledge Industries. The firm is investing its seventh private equity fund, Leeds Equity Partners VII, L.P., the largest fund focused exclusively on investing in this sector. The firm's investors include a broad range of leading institutions, public and private pension plans, endowments, foundations, financial institutions, family offices and high-net-worth individuals.

== History ==
The firm was founded in 1993 by Jeffrey T. Leeds and Robert A. Bernstein and raised its first private equity fund in 1995.

In 2017, the company relocated their New York office from 350 Park Avenue between East 51st and East 52nd Streets to the 41st floor at 590 Madison Avenue.
