= Sportscraft =

Australian clothing brand and retailer

- Industry: Retail
- Founded: 1914
- Founder: Wolf Bardas
- Headquarters: Alexandria, Sydney, Australia
- Number of locations: 250
- Area served: Australia
- Products: Apparel, footwear, accessories
- Owner: John Marshall and Andrew Michael
- Number of employees: 500+
- Parent: APG & Co
- Website: www.sportscraft.com.au

Sportscraft is an Australian women's and men's clothing brand sold through department stores and over 20 of its own branded outlets. It began with the 'Sportsleigh' manufacturing company, that grew from the tailoring business founded by Russian Jewish immigrant Wolf Bardas in Melbourne in 1914. In 1947 the business branched into retail with the first Sportsleigh stores opened in Collins Street and Toorak Road, Melbourne. The name was changed to 'Sportscraft' in 1948. The name reflected a focus on tailored casual wear, predominantly jodhpurs, slacks, pleated skirts and shirts.

Innovative marketing under the leadership of Morris Bardas resonated with women in post-war Australia and became a respected and iconic brand. After his death in 1959, his vision was continued by his son David Bardas who succeeded him at the head of the company. Over the following decades the business continued to flourish and grow, expanding into youth-oriented fashion in the 1960s and menswear in the 1970s.

In late 1987, Sportscraft acquired the Extra Clothing chain from Just Jeans for an estimated $30 million. Just Jeans had purchased the business (then known as Cheap Jeans) from founder Roger Kimberley two years prior.

By the 1990s the company had grown into a fashion empire that was producing a multimillion-dollar turnover from 200 stores and nineteen women and men's fashion labels.

In 1994, David Bardas, lost control of the group when the banks moved to secure the assets that underpinned their outstanding loans. Prime among these was the expensive Sportsgirl Centre in Collins Street, which had put the group under intense financial strain. As a result, a South African company, Truworths, was able to buy 90 per cent of the group. However, by 1999 declining sales and growing losses resulted in Truworths ceasing funding of the business. The company was put into voluntary administration in November that year. The core retail brands, Sportscraft, Sportsgirl and David Lawrence were sold individually in 2000 to respectively, Apparel Group, Sussan Corporation and Webster Holdings.

In July 2019, Sportscraft had been selected as the Official Uniform Supplier of the 2020 Australian Olympic Team. Designing both the Opening Ceremony and Formal Uniforms, this will be the eighth time Sportscraft has provided apparel for Australia's athletes.

The main Sportscraft line targets women and men aged 25-plus, as well as an expanded kids and babies range launched in 2021.

== See also ==
- SABA (clothing)
- JAG (clothing)
