= Dayanny De La Cruz =

Dominican American executive chef

- Born: 1972/1973; Nagua, Dominican Republic
- Education: Culinary arts and hospitality management
- Culinary career
- Current restaurant(s): Hard Rock Stadium
- Previous restaurant(s): DoubleTree Hotel in Skokie, Illinois; Harley-Davidson Museum; US Open; Kentucky Derby; American Airlines Arena; incomplete list

Dayanny De La Cruz (born 1972 or 1973) is a Dominican American executive chef. She was responsible for managing food services during Super Bowl LIV, and was the first woman to hold that position.

== Career ==
She earned a master's degree in Culinary Arts from Grand Rapids Community College and holds a bachelor's degree in hospitality management from the Universidad Central del Este.

Her first culinary position was as the executive chef for the DoubleTree Hotel in Skokie, Illinois. Much of her work was at sporting events and in hotel management, including the Harley-Davidson Museum, the US Open, and the Kentucky Derby.

In 2012, she moved to Miami and worked as an executive sous chef for the Miami Heat at the American Airlines Arena.

In November 2017, De La Cruz was hired as the Executive Chef at Hard Rock Stadium in Miami Gardens, Florida by Centerplate, the company in charge of food services at the stadium. She is the first Latina to hold that position.

De La Cruz remained in that role, being the executive chef for Super Bowl LIV at the Hard Rock Stadium in Miami Gardens, Florida. She is the first female chef to host a Super Bowl, and on game day led about 2,500 culinary employees with a team of 250 chefs. Her team fed the players and staff of both competing teams, the San Francisco 49ers and the Kansas City Chiefs. In addition to managing the staff and logistics, she determined what food items would be offered at the many suites, concession stands, restaurants, clubs, and other food vendors in the stadium. The menu centered around local cuisine, primarily from south Florida suppliers. It also incorporated cuisine inspired by the two teams playing, such as short ribs and lobster tails.

== Personal life ==
De La Cruz was born in the Nagua, Dominican Republic. She credits her interest in culinary arts to her grandmother, who cooked with her as a child. In 2011, she was diagnosed with ovarian cancer, and underwent three months of chemotherapy. A surgery successfully removed what remained of the cancer in 2012. She is married, and has three children.
