= Warwick Investment Group =

American alternative asset private equity firm

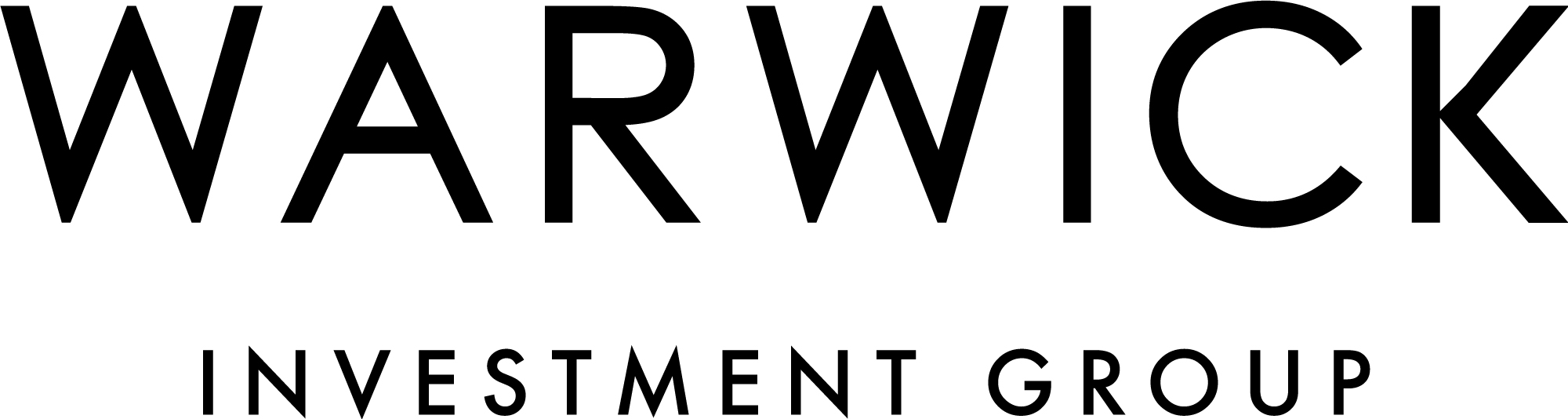
- Type: Private
- Industry: Private Equity, Energy, Real Estate
- Founded: 2010; 16 years ago
- Key people: Kate Richard (Founder, CEO, CIO); Ian Rainbolt (Co-Chief Investment Officer); Daniel Drum (Macro Strategy & New Ventures); Andrew Chrysostomou (UK Senior Managing Director); Chris Buie (CTO)
- Products: Private Equity
- Total assets: ~$2.3 billion (2022)
- Number of employees: ~150 (2025)
- Website: warwickinvestmentgroup.com

Warwick Investment Group is a SEC-registered investment advisor, managing funds that invest globally in natural resources and real estate. The firm has ~150 team members and advisors across offices in Oklahoma City, Dallas, New York and London, investing across private equity funds, special purpose vehicles and open-ended structures. The firm also manages capital for pension funds in 8 of the 50 states.

== History ==
Warwick was founded in 2010 by Kate Richard, a former Goldman Sachs investment banker and investor for MSD Capital, Michael Dell's private investment fund in New York.

=== Activities ===
- March 2025: Warwick added Palace Court, an office-to-residential conversion, to its European Residential Platform.
- July 2024: Warwick increased its operations in the Eagle Ford region through an acquisition, becoming the fifth largest holder of core Eagle Ford drilling inventory.
- May 2024: Warwick announced $150 million development agreement in Delaware Basin in Texas.
- June 2022: Warwick further consolidated its London Mayfair portfolio with the acquisition of two buildings on Green Street. Warwick received a $50 million commitment to its residential platform from the Michigan Office of Retirement Services.
- March 2022: Warwick added to its portfolio in Belgravia with the addition of its Mozart portfolio.
- December 2021: The residential platform acquired the historic 13 North Audley in Mayfair, London, through an off-market transaction.
- October 2021: Warwick acquired a rare portfolio of nine gated freehold mews houses with underground parking in Belgravia, London.
- September 2021: Warwick Investment Group increased Eagle Ford Shale footprint with $450 million acquisition from Rosewood Resources.
- June 2021: Warwick hired former CPC Group executive to lead its European real estate platform.
- March 2021: Warwick Investment Group announced its Final Close for its fourth energy fund, Warwick Partners IV, L.P.
- August 2015: Warwick announced its first closing and commenced capital deployment for Warwick Partners III, L.P., a discretionary private investment fund.
- May 2015: Warwick Energy Investment Group, LLC, an affiliate of Warwick, became a Registered Investment Adviser with the U.S. Securities and Exchange Commission.
- 2014: Warwick invested the capital of Warwick Partners II LLC in oil and gas and midstream interests in the Eagle Ford Shale of South Texas. That same year, Warwick entered into a joint venture through which it acquired oil and gas mineral and royalty assets for investor ownership on behalf of US & international pension funds.
- 2013: Warwick invested the capital of Warwick Partners I LLC in the Permian Basin of Texas, the Mid-Continent Basins of Oklahoma and Arkansas, the Powder River Basin of Wyoming, and the DJ Basin of Colorado.
- 2010: Warwick Energy Group, LLC was founded in New York.

== Investment Verticals ==
=== Natural Resources ===
Warwick's natural resources team specializes in acquiring and consolidating subsurface real estate. Warwick's active discretionary funds, Warwick Partners III and Warwick Partners IV seek to invest in cash flowing oil and gas assets and develop low breakeven cost inventory. Warwick has its own operations team to develop its properties. Active investments of note include ownership of:

- One of the largest private companies in the core of the Mid-continent oil and gas fields in Oklahoma
- Interests in the Eagle Ford Shale oil field (including midstream infrastructure) in Karnes and Live Oak Counties, Texas{
- A $450 million acquisition of operated oil and gas assets from Rosewood Resources - an entity owned by the Caroline Rose Hunt Trust Estate - which are adjacent to Warwick's Karnes and Live Oak interests

Previous divestitures include assets located in the Midland Basin in Texas, the Powder River Basin in Wyoming, the Fayetteville Shale in Arkansas, the Delaware Basin in Texas and the Bakken Shale in North Dakota. Active Warwick funds are focused on investment in low-cost oil basins in Texas, New Mexico and Oklahoma.

=== Real Estate ===
The residential platform is headed by Andrew Chrysostomou who formerly led the central London developer, CPC Group. Since 2021, Warwick has acquired over 24 multifamily buildings across central London in the Mayfair and Belgravia neighborhoods.

== Awards and affiliations ==
In October 2024, Warwick's CEO, Kate Richard, joined National Petroleum Council as a member.

In February 2020, Warwick became a signatory of the UN-supported Principles for Responsible Investment.

== See also ==
- Private equity firm
- Private equity fund
- List of private equity firms
- List of oil exploration and production companies
- List of largest oil and gas companies by revenue
- Private equity real estate
