= Kate Richard =

American businesswoman

Katherine Taaffe Richard
- Born: Katherine Taaffe Richard
- Employer: Warwick Investment Group
- Title: Founder and CEO

Katherine 'Kate' Taaffe Richard is an American business woman and the founder of Warwick Investment Group, a private equity firm focused on real assets with approximately $2.3 billion in managed assets. Warwick Investment Group is a SEC-registered investment advisor, managing funds that invest globally in natural resources and real estate. Warwick has an established track record in strategic consolidation in these sectors, having completed more than 4,200 transactions since inception. The firm has ~150 team members and advisors across offices in Oklahoma City, Dallas, New York and London, investing across private equity funds, special purpose vehicles and open-ended structures. Warwick also manages capital for pension funds in 8 of the 50 states.

== Early life and education ==
Richard's great uncle founded Devon Energy and drilled wells in the Caspian Sea following the fall of the Soviet Union.

Richard graduated in 2004 from Harvard College. Her academic focus was postcolonial theory, with a research focus on Rwanda.

== Early career ==
After graduating from Harvard, she worked at Goldman Sachs as an investment banker and investor in the private equity division in New York, Paris, and London.

After leaving Goldman Sachs in 2007, Richard invested in public and private debt and equity of oil and gas and metals and mining companies, and in sovereign debt derivatives at Serengeti Asset Management in New York.

Richard left Serengeti in 2009 to invest in international and domestic energy companies for MSD Capital, Michael Dell’s private investment firm in New York.

== Warwick Investment Group ==
Richard founded Warwick Investment Group in 2010. Warwick generates investment returns across market cycles by investing through its private equity funds, special purpose vehicles and open-ended structures. The firm manages capital for institutional investors including pension funds, insurance companies, university endowments and foundations.

Warwick's in-house data science team works with Warwick's sector investment teams, leveraging AI, natural language processing and predictive analytics to identify market opportunities and optimize portfolio investment decisions. Warwick's data science team specializes in statistics, econometrics, network analytics and machine learning.

Warwick's natural resources team specializes in acquiring and consolidating subsurface real estate. Warwick’s active discretionary funds, Warwick Partners III and Warwick Partners IV, seek to invest in cash flowing oil and gas assets while also developing low-break even inventory. Warwick partners with blue-chip operators and has its own operations team.

Warwick's real estate platforms specialize in identifying investment opportunities in markets with favorable tailwinds and attractive, risk-adjusted returns. Through consolidation strategies and development, the firm generates alpha through stable and growing yields, inflation protection and value-add returns. The current real estate focus is European multifamily, particularly in the UK. Since 2021, Warwick has acquired over 25 multifamily buildings across central London.

In October 2021, The Wall Street Journal named Richard to the Private Equity 2021 Women to Watch List. She was the only founder of a private equity firm named in the group.

== Other professional activities ==
Richard is a member of the National Petroleum Council (NPC), an advisory body to the Secretary of Energy. She has also served on a number of boards and in a variety of advisory roles. Richard has previously served on the board of directors of Imerys, SA (Euronext Paris: NK), a Paris-based industrial conglomerate, Abraxas Petroleum Corp (NASDAQ: AXAS), and Flotek Industries, Inc. (NYSE: FTK). She has also advised the Islamic Republic of Afghanistan's Ministry of Mines on energy development and transparency and was a member of the National Council of the American Enterprise Institute (AEI).

Richard regularly appears on Bloomberg and is a frequent commentator on CNBC's Power Lunch, Squawk Box and Crude Realities.

Her professional affiliations include the US Humane Society, Young Presidents’ Organization (YPO), and US Figure Skating. She is a lifetime member of the Harvard College ’04 Executive committee and the Harvard College Fund Associates Committee. Richard is a past lecturer at the Stanford Graduate School of Business, Harvard Business School, and the McCombs School of Business at the University of Texas.

== Awards and recognition ==
In October 2024, Warwick Investment Group CEO, Kate Richard joined the National Petroleum Council (NPC) as a member.

In January 2022, Warwick's CEO, Kate Richard, was featured as the cover story for NAPE magazine.

In October 2021, The Wall Street Journal named Warwick's CEO, Kate Richard to the Private Equity 2021 Women to Watch List and she was the only founder named in the group.

In February 2020, Warwick became a signatory of the UN-supported Principles for Responsible Investment.

In June 2019, Warwick's CEO, Kate Richard was selected as EY's Entrepreneur Of The Year 2019 Southwest Award for FinTech & Financial Services

In 2014, Oil & Gas Investor named Warwick's CEO, Kate Richard, one of 20 Rising Stars in the Oil & Gas Industry Under 40. She also served as a judge for Forbes "30 Under 30 in Energy" award.

Richard represented the United States in 2013 as one of the World Economic Forum's Young Global Leaders and was a member of the Forum's Oil & Gas Agenda Council.
