= Metalmark =

Metalmark may refer to:

- Riodinidae, the family of metalmark butterflies (formerly included in the Lycaenidae or "Erycinidae" as subfamily Riodininae)
  - Apodemia, the Riodinidae genus most commonly known as the metalmarks in North America
- Choreutidae, the family of moths known as the metalmark moths
- Metalmark Capital, a private equity firm
