= JAG (clothing) =

Australian clothing retailer

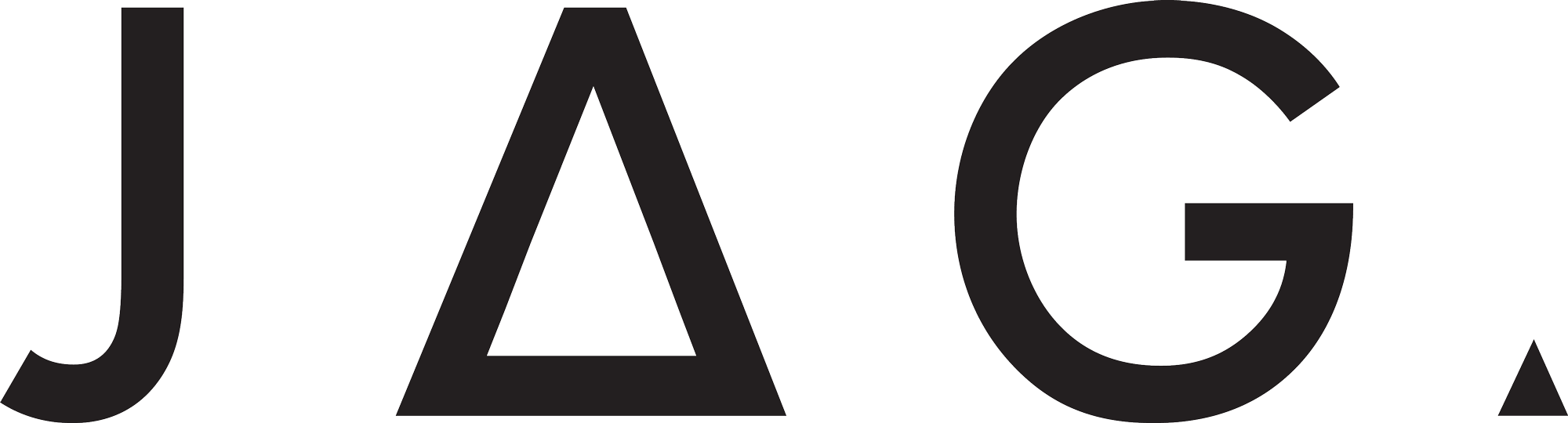
- Industry: Retail
- Founded: 1972
- Founder: Adele Palmer
- Headquarters: Mascot, Sydney, Australia
- Number of locations: 39
- Area served: Australia
- Key people: Peter Halkett (Executive Chairman)
- Products: Apparel, Footwear, Accessories
- Owner: John Marshall and Andrew Michael
- Number of employees: 500+
- Parent: APG & Co
- Website: www.jag.com.au

JAG is an Australian women's and men's clothing brand sold throughout Australia, including freestanding, concession stores, and online. JAG was founded in 1972 on Chapel Street in Melbourne by Adele Palmer.

== Expansion ==
Following the jeans boom of the '70s, JAG was the first Australia Jeans brand to launch in the US market in 1978. JAG developed a star-studded following including Mick Jagger, Jackie Onassis, Steve McQueen and Frank Sinatra.

In 2001 the Colorado Group purchased JAG and relaunched the brand with the Elizabeth Jagger campaign in 2002. In 2013, APG & Co which consists of Sportscraft, SABA and Willow, purchased JAG.
