= Elizabeth Manley =

Canadian figure skater

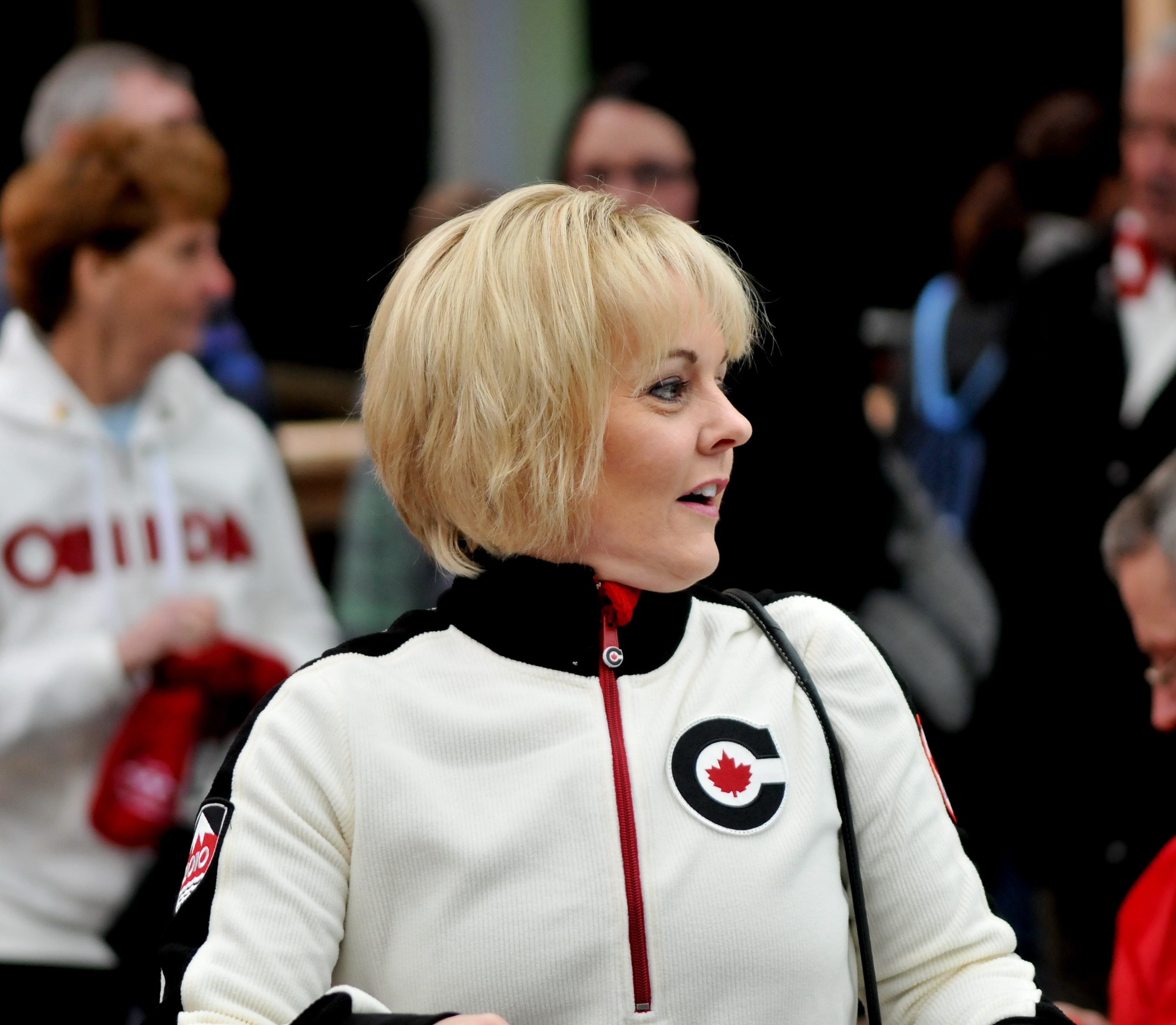
- Elizabeth Manley at the 2010 Winter Olympics

Personal information
- Born: August 7, 1965 (age 60) Belleville, Ontario
- Height: 1.52 m (5 ft 0 in)

Figure skating career
- Country: Canada
- Retired: 1988
Medal record
Representing Canada
figure skating: Ladies' singles
Winter Olympics
Silver medal – second place	1988 Calgary	Ladies' singles
World Championships
Silver medal – second place	1988 Budapest	Ladies' singles
World Junior Championships
Bronze medal – third place	1982 Oberstdorf	Ladies' singles

Elizabeth Ann Manley, CM (born August 7, 1965) is a Canadian former competitive figure skater. She is the 1988 Olympic silver medallist, the 1988 World silver medallist and a three-time Canadian national champion.

== Early life and training ==
Manley was born in 1965 in Belleville, Ontario, and raised in Trenton. She is the fourth child and only daughter in her family. Her father's military career necessitated occasionally moving, and when Manley was eight years old, her family moved from Trenton to Ottawa. After her parents' divorce in the 1970s, she was raised by her mother, Joan.

== Competitive career ==
Manley began skating at an early age. Her mother invested time and money in her daughter's figure skating career.

Manley won the bronze medal at the 1982 World Junior Championships in Oberstdorf, Germany. Later that season, she competed at her first senior World Championships and finished 13th in Copenhagen, Denmark.

In the 1982–83 season, Manley relocated from Ottawa to Lake Placid, New York, to receive more intensive training but became depressed and homesick, which resulted in her hair falling out and weight gain. She finished off the podium at the Canadian Championships and briefly dropped out of the sport, but resumed her skating career after Peter Dunfield and Sonya Dunfield agreed to coach her in Ontario. They worked with her at the Gloucester Skating Club in Orleans, Ontario.

Manley competed at the 1984 Winter Olympics, placing 13th, and the World Championships between 1984 and 1987. At the 1987 Worlds, she was in a position to vie for the world title after compulsory figures and the short program, but a poor result in the long program left her in fourth place overall in the competition.

Entering the 1988 Winter Olympics, few skating know-hows and media analysts considered Manley to be a contender for an Olympic medal. Battling illness, she nevertheless did well in compulsory figures and the short program. Heading into the long program, she was in third place behind the East German skater Katarina Witt and the American skater Debi Thomas. Witt and Thomas were both favourites for the gold medal, and the media had dubbed their rivalry as the "Battle of the Carmens", as both women chose to skate to music from the opera Carmen. Witt skated her long program cleanly but conservatively, and Thomas fell apart in her long program. Elizabeth Manley, however, gave the performance of her career, one so widely recognized as a very special performance that announcer Jim McKay said, "Wouldn't it be great if every human being could have a moment like this once in their lives?" Manley won the long program and came within a fraction of a point of beating Witt for the Olympic title. Figure skating writer and historian Ellyn Kestnbaum calls Manley's Olympic free skating program "athletic", with a triple loop, a triple lutz, a Salchow jump, and a toe loop jump. Kestnbaum also states that Manley skated with "a cheerful and outgoing style that...[was] pleasing to the audience". Her come-from-behind placement made her a national celebrity in Canada.

After winning the silver medal at the 1988 World Championships, Manley retired from amateur skating.

== Later career ==
Manley performed in ice shows and television specials, and competed in professional events, for a number of years afterwards, being notable for her unusually imaginative programs. She now works as a figure skating coach and occasional media commentator. In 1988, she was made a Member of the Order of Canada.

In 1990, Manley published an autobiography: Thumbs Up!; a second volume of autobiography, As I Am: My Life After the Olympics, followed in 1999.

In September 1990, radio personality The Real Darren Stevens launched a radio stunt, admitting that he suffered from a rare affliction: he was a Canadian who couldn't skate. While on the air, he openly "stalked" fellow Ottawa native Manley and begged her to teach him how to skate. Finally, after several months, Manley replied in January 1991, put skates on Stevens, and taught him how to skate.

Manley starred as Red Riding Hood in CBC's 1992 television film The Trial of Red Riding Hood which premiered on the Disney Channel two years later.

In 2014, she was inducted into the Canada's Sports Hall of Fame.

== Personal life ==
Manley married television producer David N. Rosen in June 2019. .

Manley is a spokesperson for mental health issues due to her own battle with depression, which began before the 1984 Olympics. As of 2009, she is also an official spokesperson for Ovarian Cancer Canada's Winners Walk of Hope. Her mother died from ovarian cancer in July 2008 and her father died of Alzheimer's disease in 2010.

She is also spokesperson for Herbal Magic weight loss.

== Results ==
International
Event	79-80	80-81	81–82	82–83	83–84	84–85	85–86	86–87	87–88
Olympics					13th				2nd
Worlds			13th		8th	9th	5th	4th	2nd
Skate America				8th					
Skate Canada			6th				2nd	1st	2nd
NHK Trophy						5th			
St. Ivel								1st	
Nebelhorn		3rd							
International: Junior
Junior Worlds			3rd						
National
Canadian Champ.	2nd J	3rd	2nd	4th	2nd	1st	2nd	1st	1st
J = Junior

== See also ==
- Petra Burka
- Karen Magnussen
- Kaetlyn Osmond
- Joannie Rochette
- Barbara Ann Scott
