= Ganyuan Foods =

Chinese food company

Ganyuan Foods Co., Ltd.
- Type: Public
- Traded as: SZSE: 002991
- Industry: Snack food
- Founded: 2006
- Headquarters: Pingxiang
- Key people: Yan Binsheng (founder & chairman)
- Website: www.gainyumfood.com

Ganyuan Foods (Chinese: 甘源食品; known as Gain Yum outside of China), commonly referred to simply as Ganyuan, is a snack maker founded in 2006. It was listed on the Shenzhen Stock Exchange in July 2020. Its main competitors include Baicaowei and Qiaqia Foods. It has set up two production bases. In 2024, its revenue reached more than 2.2 billion yuan. The company is actually controlled by Yan Binsheng.

Headquartered in Pingxiang, Ganyuan focuses on the manufacture of leisure foods. The company was funded by Sequoia China, and CoStone Capital. Primarily sold through distributors, its products are also available at Sam's Club. The company mainly operates in China, with additional presence in overseas markets, such as Canada, Australia, and New Zealand.

== History ==
Ganyuan was formed in 2006. In 2015, the company was invested in by Sequoia Capital China Fund. As of 2018, its annual snack production capacity reached 500 million tons.

In July 2020, Ganyuan went public on the SME Board with the stock code 002991. In 2023, its revenue surpassed 1.84 billion yuan. As of the end of the same year, it had 2,923 distributors.
