= APriori Capital Partners =

American private equity investment

aPriori Capital Partners
- Type: Private
- Industry: Private equity
- Founded: 1985; 41 years ago
- Founder: Donaldson, Lufkin & Jenrette
- Headquarters: New York City, New York, United States
- Key people: Head of DLJMB; Nicole Arnaboldi, Managing Director, Steven C. Rattner (former)
- Products: Financial services
- Total assets: $12 billion
- Website: aprioricapital.com

aPriori Capital Partners is a private equity investment firm focused on leveraged buyout transactions. The firm was founded as an affiliate of Credit Suisse and traces its roots to Donaldson, Lufkin & Jenrette, the investment bank acquired by Credit Suisse First Boston in 2000. The private equity arm also manages a group of investment vehicles including Real Estate Private Equity, International Private Equity, Growth capital, Mezzanine debt, Infrastructure, Energy and Commodities Focused, fund of funds, and Secondary Investments.

aPriori has offices in New York, London, Los Angeles, and Detroit.

== History ==
DLJMB (named for "Donaldson, Lufkin & Jenrette Merchant Banking") was founded in 1985 to invest capital in leveraged buyouts alongside private equity firms that were DLJ clients, off of the bank's balance sheet as well as capital contributed by employees. In 1992, the firm raised its first institutional private equity fund (DLJ Merchant Banking Partners, LP) with $1 billion in investor commitments. In 1997, the firm raised its second fund with $3 billion in investor commitments and three years later in 2000 raised its largest fund to date at $5.3 billion.

After the acquisition of DLJ, the group, which was led by Thompson Dean and Larry Schloss faced significant turnover. In 2004, DLJMB co-head Larry Schloss, completed a spinout from DLJMB to form a new private equity firm, Diamond Castle Holdings. The following year, in 2005, a team of professionals, led by Thompson Dean and Steven Webster, completed a spinout of DLJMB to form a new private equity firm, Avista Capital Partners, which raised its own $2 billion fund in 2007.

Six years after its previous fund, in 2006, the firm was able to raise $2.1 billion in investor commitments for DLJ Merchant Banking Partners IV, LP—more than doubling the $1.0 billion the company was reportedly seeking due to high investor interest. The firm is reportedly seeking to raise its fifth fund in 2009–2010, which targets $3.5 billion in investor commitments.

In 2008, Nicole Arnaboldi was named head of the firm after Steven C. Rattner resigned in the middle of fundraising for its fifth fund.

In 2014, DLJMB was spun out as aPriori Capital Partners.

== Current and prior investments ==
- Neiman Marcus — Specialty retailer of apparel and accessories
- MGM — Producer of motion pictures, TV programming, and other media, music, and merchandise
- Advanstar — Provider of marketing services for businesses and consumers
- Accellent — Provider of manufacturing and design services to medical device makers
- HealthMarkets — Life and health insurance company
- Nuveen Investments — Investment management and financial services company
- Rockwood Holdings — Manufacturer of specialty chemicals and materials
- Geokinetics — Provider of seismic data services
- Symetra Financial — Life and health insurance company
- NIBC Bank — Asset management and financial services firm
- Education and Adventure Travel Group — UK travel packager for school-children
- Guala Closures Group — Manufacturer of closures for consumer products and industrial companies
- Den-Mat Holdings — Producer of cosmetic and restorative dental products
- Wastequip — Manufacturer of waste management equipment and products
- Deffenbaugh Industries — Environmental and facilities services company
- Specialized Technology Resources — Manufacturer of solar encapsulants, for the photovoltaic solar module industry & provider of quality assurance services for general consumer merchandise.
- RathGibson — Manufacturer of industrial and machinery products
- Total Safety U.S. — Provider of safety services to industrial markets

== See also ==
- Diamond Castle Holdings

=== Notable current and former employees ===
- Steven C. Rattner
