= Travis Montaque =

American entrepreneur (born 1992)

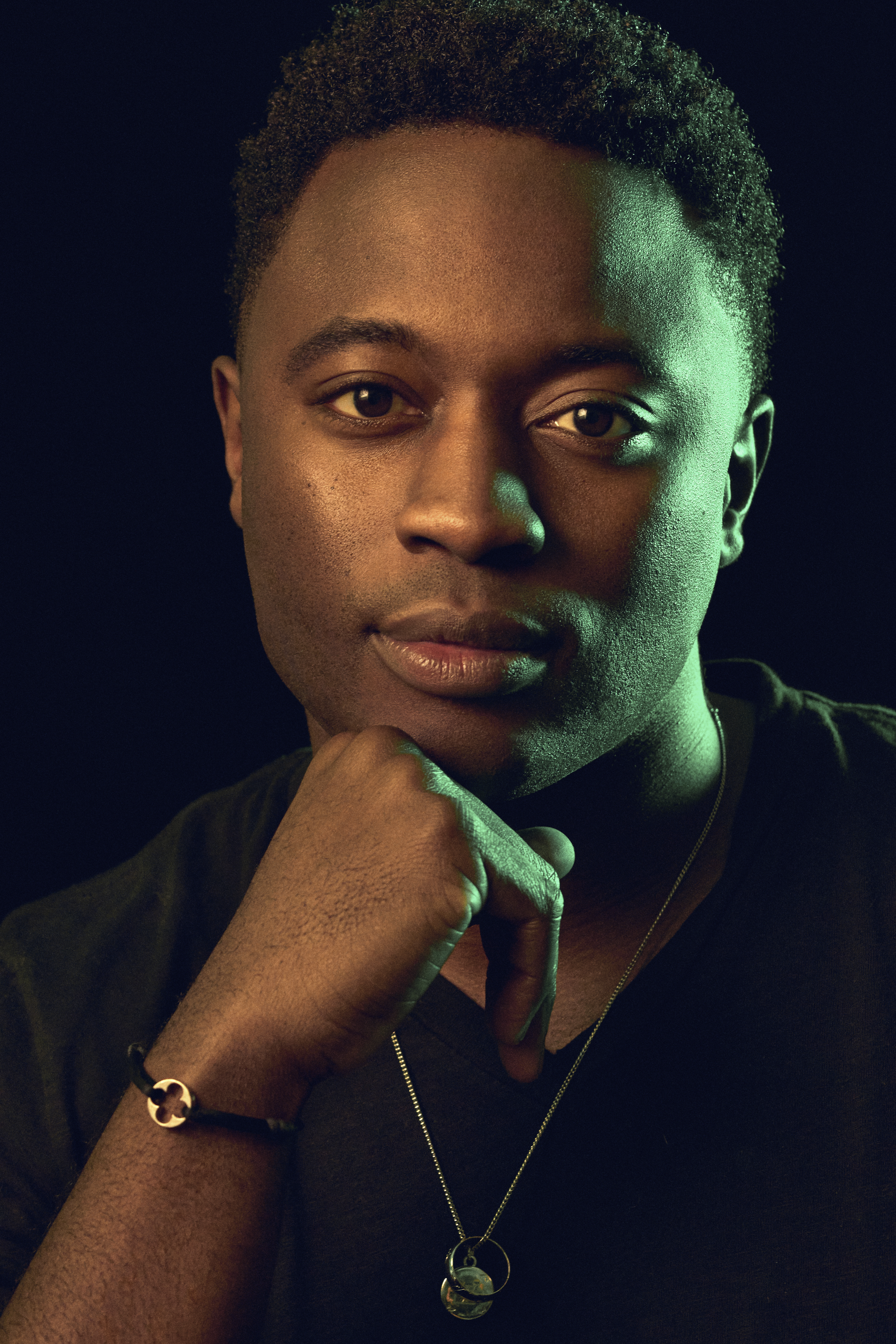
- Born: April 5, 1992 (age 34)
- Education: University of Miami
- Occupations: Founder and CEO, Holler
- Years active: 2014 - present

Travis Montaque (/ˈmɒntəˌkjuː/ MON-tə-kyoo; born April 5, 1992) is an American entrepreneur. He is the CEO and founder of Holler, a messaging technology and conversational media company. He is also the CEO and Co-Founder of Group Black, a media collective and accelerator focused on the advancement of Black-owned media properties.

== Early life and education ==
Montaque was born and raised in South Florida. He attended Everglades High School in Miramar and at 15 worked as a cashier at Chick-fil-A. He managed two franchises before he left the company at 19.

Montaque attended the University of Miami, and served as vice chairman of the Undergraduate Dean’s Advisory Board and on the School of Business's Hyperion Council. He was also a member of the Iron Arrow Honor Society, and an inaugural member of the University of Miami Marketing Advisory Board. He graduated with a degree in accounting and finance in 2014.

== Career ==
Montaque, who worked as an investment analyst at Barclays Capital and Trivest in college, also founded Splyst as an undergraduate. Following his graduation, he turned down a job at Goldman Sachs to focus on Splyst, which was renamed Emogi in 2016 and Holler in 2019. In April 2021, Holler announced their Series B Financing Round of $36M.

In June 2021, Montaque announced his new organization, Group Black, in partnership with Richelieu Dennis. Group Black aims to support Black-owned media and creators by connecting them with agencies and brands; the organization is also focused on investing in Black-owned companies. Montaque serves as the company's CEO and Co-Founder.

Montaque spoke about the importance of youth entrepreneurship at the Clinton Global Initiative (CGI) in 2013. He has written extensively on the topic of diversity in the workplace.

== Recognition ==
Montaque appeared on the Forbes "30 Under 30" list at the age of 23. He was named as one of the "50 Most Daring Entrepreneurs by Entrepreneur in 2018 and included on the Black List 100 in 2020. Fast Company named Holler to its "Most Innovative Social Media Companies" list in 2020.
