= Colorado Group (company) =

Australian retail clothing company

- Type: Subsidiary
- Traded as: ASX: CDO
- Industry: Retail clothing
- Founded: 1864
- Defunct: 2011
- Headquarters: Brisbane, Australia
- Products: Clothing, shoes
- Parent: Affinity Equity Partners
- Website: www.coloradogroup.com.au

The Colorado Group was an Australian company that operated retail clothing and footwear chains. Major brands include Colorado Adventurewear, Mathers, Williams the Shoemen, JAG, Diana Ferrari and Pairs. The company was based in Brisbane.

== History ==
The history of the Colorado Group dates back to the 1864 founding of Williams the Shoemen in Ballarat. In 1999 it was listed on the Australian Securities Exchange.

In May 2007, ARH Investments launched a successful takeover offer. Colorado was delisted from the Australian Securities Exchange on 15 August 2007.

As at June 2011 Colorado had 434 stores in Australia and New Zealand, and employed 3,800 people. It owed around $400 million to 18 financiers.

The Colorado clothing retail group went into receivership on 30 March 2011. Ferrier Hodgson was appointed administrator. Colorado was owned by Affinity Equity Partners. In 2011, the company became known as Fusion Retail Brands.

In June 2011 it was announced that the clothing chain was to close with the loss of 1,042 jobs. In Australia, 100 underperforming Colorado stores shut, 21 Williams stores, seven Mathers stores, two JAG stores and one Diana Ferrari store. In New South Wales 42 stores closed, and in Victoria 27 closed. Nine Colorado Stores in New Zealand also closed.

Colorado ceased selling its clothing lines, returning to its beginning as a shoe brand which were sold through the company's Mathers and Williams the Shoemen stores, and online. In September 2013, the JAG brand was sold to Apparel Group.

In 2014, Couper Finance purchased Fusion Retail Brands, then, in 2017, Munro Footwear Group purchased Fusion Retail Brands from Couper Finance.
