= Ridgemont Equity Partners =

American private equity firm

- Company type: Private
- Industry: Private equity
- Predecessor: BAML Capital Partners (2009-10), Bank of America Capital Investors (1993-2009), Merrill Lynch Global Private Equity (1996-2009)
- Founded: 1993 (predecessor); 2010 (spinout)
- Headquarters: Charlotte, North Carolina, United States
- Total assets: US$5 billion
- Number of employees: 25+
- Website: www.ridgemontep.com/

Ridgemont Equity Partners is a private equity firm focused on making investments in middle-market companies in the U.S. within certain industries such as basic industrial, energy, healthcare, telecommunications, media and technology. The firm focuses on equity investments up to US$250 million.

Prior to forming Ridgemont in 2010, the team previously had been known as BAML Capital Partners, and prior to that Bank of America Capital Investors. Since 1993, Ridgemont and its predecessors have invested over US$4.4 billion of equity capital.

The firm is based in Charlotte, North Carolina.

== Predecessors ==
Bank of American Merrill Lynch Capital Partners logo

Ridgemont Equity Partners completed a spinout from Bank of America in 2010, prior to which it was known as BAML Capital Partners. In turn, BAML Capital Partners traced its roots back to 1993 with the formation of Bank of America Capital Investors.

From 2009 through 2010, BAML Capital Partners was the private equity and mezzanine investment unit of Bank of America Merrill Lynch. BAML Capital Partners was formed in 2009 following the merger of Bank of America and Merrill Lynch from the combination of each bank's respective private equity units: Bank of America Capital Investors (BACI) and Merrill Lynch Global Private Equity (MLGPE).

Following the acquisition of Merrill Lynch by Bank of America, MLGPE ceased making new investments. Bank of America Capital Investors, a private equity division of Bank of America, has historically made much smaller investments than MLGPE. The two units were integrated in early 2009 with the elimination of much of the MLGPE team.

=== Merrill Lynch Global Private Equity ===
Merrill Lynch Global Private Equity logo

Merrill Lynch Global Private Equity (MLGPE) was the private equity investment arm of Merrill Lynch, prior to its merger with Bank of America. The MLGPE business was focused on leveraged buyout and growth capital investments across a range of industries. MLGPE was among the most active investment banking sponsored merchant banking programs in the mid-2000s buyout boom.

The firm, which is based in New York City, was founded in 1996. Since inception, MLGPE has invested more than US$5 billion of capital across more 30 companies.

Among the group's most notable investments are some of the largest leveraged buyout transactions of the last decade, including The Hertz Corporation, Hospital Corporation of America, Debenhams and Rexel.
