= Herbal Magic =

Canadian Health Nutrition and Weight Loss Company

- Company type: Private
- Industry: Weight Loss; Health & Wellness; Nutrition
- Founded: 1995
- Headquarters: 2180 Matheson Boulevard East; Mississauga, Ontario; L4W 5E1
- Key people: Troy Nahmiache (President)
- Number of employees: 11-50
- Website: www.herbalmagic.ca

Herbal Magic is a Canadian weight loss and nutrition company based in Toronto, Ontario (with a retail location in Burlington, Ontario) that previously operated over 300 weight loss and nutrition centers across Canada as the nation’s largest commercial weight loss company. Today, Herbal Magic operates as an online e-commerce store offering natural health products, wellness accessories, and weight loss programs with virtual weight loss coaching administered via live video, telephone, and email.

== History ==
Herbal Magic was founded in 1995 by Dieter Decker, who opened his first weight loss and nutrition center in London, Ontario. After growing the business to 228 centers nationwide (220 in Canada, and 8 under the name Nutri Magic in Michigan), Decker sold the company in December 2003 to Trivest, a Miami, Florida-based private investment firm. Trivest appointed Tom McNeely of Tim Hortons as CEO, and the number of units grew by nearly 45%, to 300 stores. In the summer of 2006, Trivest hired CIBC World Markets to launch an auction of Herbal Magic. In October 2006, Herbal Magic was sold to TorQuest Partners.

During 2009, Cameron Capital, a Toronto-based firm whose investments include Hair Club for Men and Beauty First, invested in the business. On February 18, 2009, the company announced a change in ownership making new investments in Herbal Magic Inc., including a personal investment from incoming Chairman Steve Hudson. The principles of Cameron Capital became managing partners of Herbal Magic, overseeing both strategic and daily operations. On August 7, 2015, the company restructured and closed all of its central and eastern Canada stores. Its 41 western Canada stores were taken over by a secured lender and closed in 2016.

Since 2016, Herbal Magic weight loss plans and supplements have remained available to Canadians coast to coast through various distributors, as well as their national coaching center in Mississauga, Ontario run by President Troy Nahmiache. All Herbal Magic weight loss programs are now provided virtually through video calls, telephone, and email by certified Personal Health Coaches.

== Criticism ==
The February 5, 2010 episode of the investigative news program CBC Marketplace examined the health effects of Herbal Magic's optional supplement products. The program and its independent experts determined there was insufficient empirical evidence to convince them that the supplements facilitate weight loss. Accordingly, the documentary claimed it observed Herbal Magic salespeople using tactics that lead customers to overestimate the supplements' effectiveness. Marketplace also interpreted Herbal Magic's practice of only telling customers the cost of the program after a free consultation as disingenuous.

=== 2010 Weight Loss Cup ===
From July to October 2010, Herbal Magic and the Canadian Football League (CFL) co-sponsored a highly publicized Weight Loss Cup. Eight Canadian Football League alumni engaged in an amiable 20-week competition to lose weight and adopt a healthier lifestyle, using Herbal Magic’s old program. They included Gerry Dattilio of the Calgary Stampeders, Ralph Scholz of the Hamilton Tiger-Cats, Chris Walby of the Blue Bombers, Gerald Roper of the BC Lions, Eric Upton of the Edmonton Eskimos, Andre Greene of the Saskatchewan Roughriders, Doug Smith of the Montreal Alouettes, and Paul Markle of the Toronto Argonauts. Gerry Dattilio achieved the most points and was crowned the Weight Loss Cup Champion. Fans could vote online for their favourite player. Besides weekly prizes for voting, voters could win a grand prize of a trip for two to the Grey Cup.
