= Tegel Foods =

New Zealand poultry company

- Type: Private
- Founded: 1961
- Headquarters: Auckland, New Zealand
- Owner: Bounty Fresh
- Website: https://www.tegel.co.nz/

Tegel Foods Limited is a New Zealand poultry producer that is 100% owned by the Philippine parent company, Bounty Fresh. The company is involved in breeding, hatching, processing, marketing, sales, and distribution of poultry products across New Zealand and to selected international markets. With over 2,300 employees nationwide, Tegel offers both cage free and free range chickens across a wide range of products. Tegel is independently audited to meet the highest New Zealand animal welfare standards.

== History ==
Tegel was established in 1961. It was subsequently owned by H. J. Heinz and Pacific Equity Partners. In 2011, Affinity Equity Partners acquired the business from Pacific Equity Partners and other shareholders, including ANZ Capital.

The company's parent, Tegel Group Holdings, listed on the New Zealand Exchange and the Australian Securities Exchange in May 2016. Shares were offered at NZ$1.55 each, and trading began on 3 May.

In 2018, Bounty Fresh Food made a takeover offer that valued Tegel Group at approximately NZ$438 million. Tegel's independent directors recommended that shareholders accept the offer. Bounty acquired the business in September 2018, and Tegel was delisted the following month.

== Operations ==
Tegel operates a vertically integrated poultry business, covering breeding, hatching, processing, marketing and distribution. In 2022, it sourced chickens from approximately 100 farms nationwide and operated hatcheries in each of its three production regions. Its processing plants are located in Auckland, New Plymouth and Christchurch. Contract growers near the plants rear chicks supplied by Tegel to the company's specifications.

Tegel has products available for international markets across retail, food service and fast food (QSR) channels. It currently exports to the Pacific Islands, Australia, Asia & the Middle East.

== Controversy ==
Sue Kedgley MP, New Zealand Green Party Animal Welfare Spokesperson, lodged a complaint with the New Zealand Advertising Standards Complaints Board in February 2002 about allegedly misleading Tegel promotions.
