= Tiantu Capital =

Chinese investment company

Tian Tu Capital Co., Ltd.
- Native name: 深圳市天图投资管理股份有限公司
- Formerly: Tiantu Chuangye
- Company type: Public
- Traded as: NEEQ: 833979; SEHK: 1973
- Industry: Investment management
- Founded: 2000; 26 years ago
- Founder: Wang Yonghua
- Headquarters: Shenzhen, Guangdong, China
- Key people: Wang Yonghua (Chairman); Feng Weidong (CEO)
- Net income: ▼CN¥−875.69 million (2023)
- AUM: CN¥24.40 billion (2023)
- Total assets: ▼CN¥16.72 billion (2023)
- Total equity: ▼CN¥7.33 billion (2023)
- Number of employees: 87 (2023)
- Website: www.tiantu.com.cn

Tiantu Capital (Tiantu; Chinese: 天图投资; pinyin: Tiāntú Tóuzi) is a publicly listed Chinese investment management company that focuses on venture capital (VC) and private equity (PE) investments. It has a focus on the consumer industry in China.

== Background ==
The company was founded in 2002 originally as Tiantu Chuangye by portfolio manager Wang Yonghua. It was one of China's earliest VC and PE firms and it focused on investing in consumer-oriented companies.

During the first few years, the company invested with its own capital to accumulate experience and reputation.

In 2010, the company was renamed to Tiantu Capital.

In 2015, Tiantu held its initial public offering (IPO) listed on the National Equities Exchange and Quotations (NEEQ) to become a public company.

In 2017, Tiantu reorganized to established several business segments which included VC, PE, M&A and investment holding to offer more comprehensive business services. A year later, Tiantu launched its first angel investment fund.

In 2018, Wang said at an investment conference in Hong Kong that the fundraising environment was tough and that in five years time it would be even worse with one of the factors being regulatory scrutiny. This prediction proved to be true as by 2022 the number of remaining VC and PE funds had fallen by half to just 7,000 and the growth of the market slowed down. However, for Tiantu, between 2015 and 2022 its assets under management grew at a compound annual rate of 19.5% to 25.5 billion yuan.

In May 2022, it was reported that Tiantu was planning to list on the Hong Kong Stock Exchange (SEHK). On 6 October 2023, Tiantu listed on the SEHK. The timing of the listing was less-than-ideal as fundraising in Hong Kong hit an 11-year low that year. China's VC deals in the market fell 31.4% in the first half of 2023 from 2022. The offering was undersubscribed and raised US$144.5 million which was below the US$500 million target. On its trading debut day, Tiantu shares dropped 25% and a week later, Tiantu was trading at 30% below its initial offering price. However the listing brought a certain prestige to Tiantu as it was the first company from its class to be dually listed in Hong Kong and on the NEEQ.

In April 2024. Tiantu released in 2023 annual report which showed it went from a profit in 2022 to making a loss in 2023. Many of Tiantu's portfolio companies aimed to list on the SEHK as they were consumer-orientated that could pay dividends which were popular among Hong Kong-based investors. During 2023, the Hang Seng Index fell 14% and the number of IPOs on the SEHK hit a 20-year low which significantly affected Tiantu as this was its main exit strategy to recoup investments on its portfolio companies. Tiantu said it was shifting to other non-IPO exit strategies such as selling its holdings to other buyers. It also diversified into non-consumer industries such as raising biotechnology fund to invest in companies that were more attractive to big state-run investors over consumer-related ones.

Tiantu has mainly invested in China's consumer industry with investments including Jiangxiaobai. In 2023 it was ranked third terms of investment projects in China's consumer industry behind Tencent, and HongShan. It has also made investments outside that sector such as ATRenew and Xiaohongshu.
