= Steven C. Rattner =

- Education: B.A., Franklin & Marshall College; J.D., University of Pittsburgh; MBA, Stern School of Business
- Occupation: Private equity investor
- Employer(s): Donaldson, Lufkin & Jenrette (prior), Credit Suisse First Boston (prior), DLJ Merchant Banking Partners (prior)
- Known for: Former Head of DLJ Merchant Banking Partners

Steven C. Rattner (born 1960) was a managing director of Credit Suisse in the Asset Management division and the former Head of its DLJ Merchant Banking Partners affiliate.

== Career ==
Rattner joined Donaldson, Lufkin & Jenrette in 1985 as an associate in its Investment Banking division working in DLJ's top ranked leveraged finance business. At DLJ, he held many critical positions including Head of DLJ's European Fixed Income business in London serving on the board of DLJ International.

In 2000, when Donaldson, Lufkin & Jenrette was acquired by Credit Suisse First Boston, Rattner was Head of International Fixed Income. Rattner would move to become the Head of European Leveraged Finance responsible for all underwriting and client coverage involving the high yield and syndicated loan products for the merged firm.

In 2001, Rattner was named head of Credit Suisse First Boston's private equity affiliate, DLJ Merchant Banking Partners. In this capacity, he served on the Investment Committees of MBP II, III, and IV. Rattner has also served on the boards of various companies including Warner Chilcott, United Site Services, Hard Rock Hotel, and Peach Holdings.

Rattner stepped down from his position as head of DLJ Merchant Banking Partners in 2008 amidst controversy around Rattner's affair with a married woman, Kelly Cosgrove. Tommi Cosgrove, upon learning of his wife's affair conducted an internet campaign against Rattner. Rattner stepped down from his position although he had not violated any Credit Suisse policies. He was replaced by Nicole Arnaboldi.

== Education ==
Rattner received a B.A. from Franklin & Marshall College and a J.D. from the University of Pittsburgh, where he was a member of the Law Review, and an M.B.A. from the Stern School of Business at New York University.
