= Vulcan Capital Management =

American private equity firm

- Type: Private
- Industry: Private Equity
- Founded: 1997; 29 years ago
- Headquarters: 75 Rockefeller Plaza, 18th Floor, New York City, United States
- Key people: Ford F. Graham, co-founder, Kevin C. Davis, co-founder
- Products: Leveraged buyout, Venture capital, Growth capital, Mezzanine capital

Vulcan Capital Management, Inc was founded in May 1997 by Ford Graham and Kevin Davis (and is a different and unrelated entity to Vulcan Capital or Vulcan Inc., two companies founded by Paul Allen.). It is a private equity firm focusing on investments in distressed restructurings, acquisitions, growth capital, mezzanine capital, leveraged buyouts, recapitalizations and structured equity in the energy, natural resources and green technology sectors in the United States, Canada, Nigeria, Bangladesh and Iraq. with typical investments being between $10 million and $300 million.

In 2005 one of Ford's companies, Vulcan Energy Solutions, signed a contract that soon went awry for $64 million with Iraq's minister for electricity, Aiham Alsammarae, to fix the Mulla Abdullah power plant in Kirkuk. An employee, J.C. Adams, was at the meeting and had worked on some of Vulcan's subcontracts in Iraq, and later testified that he was owed $150,000 in unpaid salary. Adams testified that he had been told he would finally be paid his salary if Vulcan won the Mulla Abdullah contract and that Ford Graham told a group of employees that he had agreed to include a $3 million “engineering fee” in the final contract as a bribe to get the contract.

== History ==
Vulcan Capital Management (not to be confused with Vulcan Inc. and its investment arm Vulcan Capital founded by Paul Allen) was founded in May 1997 by Ford Graham and Kevin Davis, and maintains principal offices in New York, NY, and Houston, TX. Since its founding in 1997, Vulcan has completed over 35 transactions worldwide, with a value exceeding $800 million through its family of partner funds and portfolio firms.

Ford Graham, 56, a 1986 alumnus of Princeton University, and his wife, Katherine Graham, 55, were arrested on Nov. 21 and remanded to the Bureau of Prisons and taken to the Metropolitan Correctional Center in Manhattan. Graham, a former Princeton resident accused in a lawsuit of running a $5 million Ponzi scheme, has been released from the Metropolitan Correctional Center in Manhattan after spending more than two months there. Graham, together with his wife, Katherine, had been ordered jailed by federal judge Loretta A. Preska for failing to provide documents related to an earlier fraud case that dates back to 2003. The couple are being sued by Susan Flannigan, who worked for one of Ford Graham's companies, Vulcan Power Group. She successfully sued Graham for $2 million in unpaid commission and salary but has not collected the judgment. (U.S. 1, December 4, 2019.) Katherine Graham was released after six days, and on January 24, Preska ordered Ford Graham released under the conditions that he lives 100 miles or less from the courthouse in New York, comply with discovery demands, and help recover certain documents related to the case.

== Investment focus ==
Vulcan Capital Management projects center around energy and natural resources sectors with a heavy focus on coal mining and power plants, water resource management, and natural gas exploration. Since 2007 Vulcan has diversified to include water treatment services and real estate development.

== Investment funds ==
The first Vulcan investment platform, Vulcan Partners I & II was created in 1998 and was followed by NRVG, NRVG II & NRVG which invested over $300 million in the coal industry. In 2002, Vulcan created and led an investor group that acquired select power plant assets from Enron. They paid less than $100,000 for these two power plants and subsequently invested over $12 million in environmental cleaning equipment to make these plants the cleanest coal-fired power plants in the northeastern US. In 2003, Vulcan created and structured the acquisition of Duke Energy's oil and gas division in the Gulf of Mexico. In 2004, Vulcan's coal operations ranked as the seventh largest in the U.S. In 2004, Vulcan expanded its energy services company into Iraq and installed and repaired hundreds of Megawatts of power. Vulcan's power plants were the first new post-war power plants in Iraq. In 2007, Vulcan launched Vulcan Partners III, a $400 million fund to originate and lead acquisitions and investments in Middle-Market natural resources and energy companies. In 2007, Vulcan, with its partner Graoch Associates, planned to launch Aventine Hill Real Estate Fund I, a $300 million investment focusing on acquisition, financing, operation, and disposition of rental apartment communities located throughout the United States however this Project was never enacted.

== Assets and funds under management ==
- LaserLine - Vulcan Energy Leasing, LLC - In 2004, Vulcan created a joint venture with LaserLine Lease Finance Corporation, Palm Springs, ing, a major lease hold company. LaserLine-Vulcan Energy Leasing is engaged in the sale and lease of large electrical power systems, aircraft, marine, medical, and other capital equipment.
- North Carolina Power Holdings, LLC (NCPH) - In 2003, Vulcan acquired NCPH, a company consisting of two 35 MW coal-fired power plants in the Atlantic coast region.
- Vulcan Amps, LLC - In 2002, Vulcan acquired several power plant assets from Enron. Vulcan Advanced Mobile Power Systems (AMPS) manufactures some of the world's largest portable power generators and were the first new post-war power plants installed in Iraq. It is now cannibalized due to repeated bombings by Iraq militants. Vulcan Amps filed for Bankruptcy, in 2008.
- Vulcan Coal Partners, LP - In 2006, Vulcan purchased assets and mining equipment in Central Appalachia (Alabama, Tennessee, and Kentucky) with more than 26 million tons of coal reserves.
- Vulcan Energy International, LLC - Created in 2003, Vulcan Energy International (VEI) provides power plant solutions and services to customers world-wide. VEI's projects include contracting as a sub contractor and minority shareholder to a Nigerian company Vulcan Elvaton Limited, which in 2008 was contracted by the Sokoto State government of Nigeria to build a $32 million (N3.8 billion) 30 megawatts LPFO/SNG fueled turbine power station. This project was never completed due to the lack of progress draw payments in contravention of the sub contract agreement. and GVEI, which announced in 2005 the investment of more than $1.6 billion in power production, coal mining and fertilizer production in Bangladesh.
- Vulcan Energy of Canada, LTD. - In 2001, Vulcan's portfolio company acquired 70,000 acres of Canadian coal bed methane reserves with over 1.5 trillion cubic feet of natural gas.
- Vulcan Energy Solutions, LLC (VES)- Founded in 2003, Vulcan Energy Solutions provides power plant operations and maintenance services and support to the Government of Iraq.
- Vulcan Petroleum Resources Limited - Vulcan Petroleum is a 2012 formed Nigeria corporation incorporated to develop, construct, majority own, and operate 6 modular refineries (with a combined capacity of 180,000bpd) to operate in Nigeria. The MOU signed with the Ministry of Investment is stalled due to other government Ministries bureaucracy.
- Vulcan Water Resources, LTD - Vulcan Water Resources provides water engineering services and products.
- Vulcan Water Services, LLC -
