= Steven Webster =

American businessman

Steven A. Webster
- Education: Purdue University; Harvard Business School
- Occupation: Businessman
- Employer: Avista Capital Partners

Steven Webster is an American businessman and conservative donor.

== Personal life and education ==
Webster graduated from Purdue University in 1973, and earned an MBA from Harvard Business School in 1975.

== Career ==
Webster founded Falcon Drilling, an inland barge drilling contractor in 1988. Webster grew the company as CEO, eventually leading a merger to create R&B Falcon Holdings. Webster co-founded Avista Capital Holdings in 2005. He remains a co-managing partner, in charge of investments in the energy sector. Webster also is president of Peregrine Management.

== Political activities ==
Webster donated $1,000,000 to Restore Our Future, Mitt Romney's Super PAC. Webster has also supported the NRSC, Pat Toomey, David Vitter, and other Republican politicians.
