= LESLi =

- Owner: STR
- Website: www.lesli.strrs.com
- Launched: February 2010

LESLi (short for Labor and Employment Standards Library) is an American online resource that helps academics, sourcing, legal, and investment professionals gain access to continually updated information on labor, wage, and health and safety laws applicable to social compliance assessments.

LESLi was launched by STR Responsible Sourcing in February 2010, it contains a searchable collection of relevant legal text excerpts for over 140 countries, translated into English from their foreign-language originals.
