= Pamlico Capital =

American private equity firm

- Type: Private company
- Industry: Private equity
- Predecessor: First Union Capital Partners; Wachovia Capital Partners
- Founded: 1988; 38 years ago
- Headquarters: Charlotte, North Carolina, United States
- Products: Growth capital, Leveraged buyout
- Total assets: $3.5 billion
- Number of employees: 30+
- Parent: First Union (prior); Wachovia (prior); Wells Fargo (prior)
- Website: www.pamlicocapital.com

Pamlico Capital, which was formerly called First Union Capital Partners and then Wachovia Capital Partners, is an independent private equity firm focused on growth capital and leveraged buyout investments in middle-market companies in the business services, technology services, telecommunications and healthcare industries.

The firm, which is based in Charlotte, North Carolina, was founded in 1988 as the private equity investment arm of First Union Corporation. The firm has invested approximately $3.8 billion in more than 200 companies since inception across two funds.

The firm is named for the Pamlico Sound, which is located in North Carolina.

== Investments ==
Among the firm's notable investments are Daxko, Dexter & Chaney, Lightower Fiber Networks, MetaMetrics, Secure-24, Service Express, symplr, TMW Systems and Wilcon.

== Spinout from Wells Fargo ==
Wachovia Capital Partners logo

Founded as First Union Capital Partners in 1988, the firm served as the private equity investment arm of First Union, a commercial bank based in Charlotte. The firm changed its name to Wachovia Capital Partners following the merger of First Union and Wachovia in 2001, under Managing Partners Scott Perper and Ted Gardner.

In 2005, Frederick (Eric) W. Eubank and L. Watts Hamrick, among the original partners at conception of First Union Capital Partners, were named Managing Partners of the firm alongside Scott Perper, Chief Financial Officer Tracey M. Chaffin, and Partners: Art C. Roselle, Walker C. Simmons, and Scott R. Stevens. Perper was still managing partner when the firm became independent in 2010. As of October 2026, Perper, Eubank and Hamrick are advisory partners of the firm, Chaffin is partner and chief financial officer, and Roselle, Simmons and Stevens remain partners.

As a captive private equity investment arm, the firm focused on growth capital, leveraged buyout and mezzanine capital investments in middle-market companies across a range of industries. The firm invested both as the lead investor or an equity co-investor alongside other financial sponsors.

During the 2008 financial crisis, the firm's parent, Wachovia was acquired by Wells Fargo, which had an existing private equity platform, Norwest Equity Partners. In March 2010, the firm completed a spinout from Wells Fargo.

== Pamlico Capital Funds ==
In October 2013, Pamlico Capital closed Fund III at $650 million, well-exceeding the original goal of $500 million. Pamlico Capital III is the first fund raised after the spin-out from Wells Fargo in 2010. While previous Funds had a majority investment from the financial institution, Pamlico Capital III exclusively includes outside investors: AlpInvest Partners, Constitution Capital Partners, GE Pension Trust, HarbourVest Partners, affiliates of Hartford Investment Management Company (HIMCO), HOOPP Capital Partners (the private equity arm of the Healthcare of Ontario Pension Plan), John Hancock Financial Services, SCM Strategic Capital Management, AG and TIAA-CREF.

Three years later in November 2016, Pamlico Capital closed Fund IV at the hard cap with total commitments of $910 million. Pamlico Capital IV (PC IV) raised its capital in only four months, was oversubscribed and significantly exceeded the original $750 million target.

In February 2020, the firm closed its fifth fund, Pamlico Capital V (PC V). PC V was well oversubscribed with demand from existing and new investors materially surpassing the original $1.25 billion target. As with Pamlico’s previous funds, PC V will seek equity investments of $25 million to $125 million in growing companies with total enterprise values of between $50 million and $350 million.
