= Affinity Equity Partners =

Asian private equity firm

- Type: Private Ownership
- Industry: Private Equity
- Founded: 1998; 28 years ago
- Headquarters: Hong Kong; Singapore; Seoul, South Korea; Beijing, China; Sydney, Australia
- Key people: Tang Kok Yew (Founding chairman)
- Products: Private equity funds
- AUM: $14 billion (2023)
- Website: www.affinityequity.com

Affinity Equity Partners is an Asian private equity firm that focuses on leveraged buyout and growth capital transactions. Affinity operates as a Pan-Asian firm focusing on investment opportunities in Korea, Southeast Asia, Greater China, Australia, and New Zealand.

The firm is independently owned and operated, with founding partners who have worked together since 1998. It has over 80 employees with headquarters in Singapore and offices in Hong Kong, Singapore, Seoul, Beijing, and Sydney.

== History ==
Affinity is one of the early pioneer in Asian buyouts, having started private equity investing in 1998. The team was originally known as UBS Capital Asia Pacific and served as the Asian private equity arm of UBS AG.

UBS Capital Asia Pacific was spun out as an independent firm in 2004. By 2023, Affinity was one of the largest independent Private Equity firms in the Asia Pacific region and advised and manages approximately US$ 14 billion of funds and assets. Its Affinity Asia Pacific Fund V closed at its US$6 billion hard cap, and is one of the largest in the region.

== Major investments ==
Among Affinity's investments are or have been the following:

- Beijing Leader Harvest (China)
- Bojie Oriental Media (China)
- Burger King (Japan, Korea)
- Colorado Group (Australia)
- Eastern Pacific Circuits (Hong Kong)
- The Face Shop (Korea)
- First Engineering (Singapore)
- Haitai Confectionery (Korea)
- Hi-Mart (Korea)
- Inter office (Japan)
- IPAC Securities (Australia)
- Jaya (Singapore)
- Korea Digital Satellite Broadcasting (Korea)
- Kyobo Life Insurance Company (Korea)
- Kakao M (Korea)
- Loscam (Australia)
- Mando Corporation (Korea)
- MedicalDirector (Australia)
- MK Electron (Korea)
- NS Electronics Bangkok (Thailand)
- Oriental Brewery (Korea)
- Primo Smallgoods (Australia)
- PT Sido Muncul Tbk (SIDO) (Indonesia)
- Pulmuone Foods (Korea)
- RT Holdings (Hong Kong)
- Scottish Pacific Business Finance (Australia & New Zealand)
- SDL Leasing (Singapore)
- TEG (Australia)
- Tegel Foods (New Zealand)
- United Test and Assembly Center (Singapore)
- Velocity Frequent Flyer (Australia)
- WiniaMando (Korea)
