= Specialized Technology Resources =

American corporations for special technologies

Specialized Technology Resources, abbreviated as STR, was an American corporation headquartered in Enfield, Connecticut. It had two divisions – Solar Cell Encapsulant Manufacturing and Quality Assurance Services for Consumer Products. On September 14, 2023, the dissolution was announced.

== Solar Encapsulant Manufacturing ==
STR's Solar Encapsulant Manufacturing business is a provider of solar encapsulants, for the photovoltaic solar module industry. STR supplies many of the major solar module manufacturers in the world. The company, in conjunction with the predecessor to the U.S. Department of Energy, was the first to develop modified ethylene-vinyl-acetate, or EVA, encapsulants used in commercial solar module manufacturing in the 1970s, and has sold its EVA encapsulants commercially since then. STR’s encapsulants are used in both of the prevailing solar panel technologies, crystalline and thin-film. STR has developed many significant innovations since it first commercialized its products, including encapsulants with dimensional stability, advanced laminates, ultra-fast curing formulations and thermoplastic encapsulants designed specifically for thin-film photovoltaics. The company operates production facilities in five locations – three in the United States, one in Malaysia, and one in Spain.

== Quality Assurance Services ==
STR’s Quality Assurance Services business is part of the consumer products quality assurance market. STR has offered quality assurance services since 1983 and has more than 45 internationally recognized accreditations and memberships. STR’s quality assurance business has a network of 16 laboratories, 72 inspection and audit offices and 22 sales offices in 37 countries across North America, South America, Europe, Asia, and Africa. The Quality Assurance Service Unit was sold to Underwriters Laboratories in 2011.

== History ==
STR was founded in 1944 under the name DeBell & Richardson Inc. as the first dedicated plastics research and development firm in the United States. In 1972, then-president Robert C. Springborn purchased the company, changed the name to Springborn Laboratories, and broadened the scope to include testing, analysis, and quality assurance for the chemicals and plastics, electrical/electronics, and consumer products markets. STR launched its quality assurance business in 1983 and commenced sales of its solar encapsulant products under the PhotoCap trademark in the late 1970s. When the business was sold in 1991, and subsequently split and merged in 1996, the company changed its name to Springborn Testing and Research and branded the letters “STR.” In 1998, the company again changed its name to Specialized Technology Resources and still is referenced as “STR.” In June 2007, DLJ Merchant Banking Partners, a division of Credit Suisse, purchased STR. On November 6, 2009, STR had its initial public offering on the New York Stock Exchange under the ticker symbol, STRI.

in September 2023 the Board of Directors announced the dissolution of Specialized Technology Resources (STR).

== See also ==
- LESLi (2010) searchable collection
