= DCP Capital =

Chinese private equity firm

- Native name: 德弘资本
- Company type: Private
- Industry: Private equity
- Founded: 2017; 9 years ago
- Founders: David Liu; Julian Wolhardt
- Headquarters: Beijing, China
- Key people: David Liu (Chairman); Julian Wolhardt (CEO)
- AUM: US$5.5 billion (2023)
- Website: dcpcapital.com

DCP Capital (also known as DCP and Dehong Capital Partners; Chinese: 德弘资本; pinyin: Déhóng zīběn) is a Chinese private equity firm headquartered in Beijing, China. The firm focuses on the consumer, healthcare, education and technology sectors in Asia.

DCP has additional offices in Hong Kong and Shanghai.

== Background ==
In 2016, David Liu and Julian Wolhardt left their positions at Kohlberg Kravis Roberts to form their own investment firm. Both of them were previously Partners at the company where they were in charge of investments in the China region. Prior to that, they both worked together at Morgan Stanley Private Equity.

In 2017, the duo established DCP which would focus mainly on China. The firm's strategy was to focus on buyout deals especially in situations when a family business is seeking to by sold because the founder's children were not interested in taking over. DCP would also focus on state-owned enterprise reforms and taking companies private. At the same time, DCP would look at cross-border deals between overseas businesses and the Chinese market.

In April 2019, DCP raised $2.5 billion for its debut fund which at the time was the sixth biggest China fund since the 2008 financial crisis. The fund was significantly oversubscribed due to strong demand and its investors included GIC, Temasek Holdings, Caisse de dépôt et placement du Québec and the New York State Common Retirement Fund.

In October 2019. DCP released a statement condemning imposters who have been using its brand name to defraud investors. It stated that the fraudsters replicated its official information online and tried to collect funds from the public by selling them wealth management products. The fraudsters used a mobile app which had an identical copy of DCP's official website and offered investment products such as futures on crude oil and gold. DCP has stated it has never offered any of these products.

In June 2022, DCP raised $2.5 billion out of its $3 billion target for its second fund. The State Board of Administration of Florida was one of the investors and committed $100 million to the fund.

== Notable deals ==
In August 2018, DCP joined an investor consortium led by Hillhouse Capital to acquire listed company Yum China for $13 billion which would be the largest Chinese acquisition of a consumer company at the time. However, later that month, the deal fell through after Yum China rejected the offer.

In March 2022, China-based jobs portal, 51job that was listed on the Nasdaq at the time, agreed to a privatization offer of $4.3 billion from DCP.

In February 2023, DCP acquired a minority interest in the Chinese operations of Jamieson Wellness, a Canadian multinational pharmaceutical company. DCP paid $35 million for 33.3% of the Chinese business. It also subscribed for $75 million of preferred shares of Jamieson Wellness.

On 31 May 2023, Cargill sold its China poultry unit to DCP citing difficulties in market conditions due to factors such as the Russian invasion of Ukraine and the COVID-19 pandemic.

On 1 January 2025, Alibaba Group announced its deal of selling a majority 78.7% share in supermarket chain Sun Art Retail Group to DCP for HK$12.298 billion ($1.58 billion).

The firm is known for backing Ping An Insurance, Mengniu Dairy, Haier and China International Capital Corporation.
