= Avista Healthcare Partners =

American private equity firm

- Formerly: Avista Capital Partners, LLP
- Company type: Private
- Industry: Private equity
- Predecessor: DLJ Merchant Banking Partners
- Founded: 2005; 21 years ago
- Founders: Thompson Dean; Steven Webster; David Burgstahler
- Headquarters: New York, New York, United States
- Products: Leveraged buyout, Growth capital
- Total assets: $5 billion
- Website: avistahealthcare.com

Avista Healthcare Partners (formerly "Avista Capital Partners, LLP" is an American private equity firm headquartered in New York City focused on growth capital and leveraged buyout investments in middle-market companies in the domestic healthcare sector.

== History ==
The firm was founded in 2005 by Steven Webster, Thompson Dean and David Burgstahler, as a spinoff from Credit Suisse's private equity arm DLJ Merchant Banking Partners (Dean was head of DLJMBP). Avista's spinoff from Credit Suisse was at the same time as private equity groups from other leading investment banks were formed including JPMorgan Chase's CCMP Capital, Citigroup's Court Square Capital Partners, Deutsche Bank's MidOcean Partners, and Morgan Stanley's Metalmark Capital.

In 2007, the firm closed its first fund at $2 billion. This included a commitment from predecessor Credit Suisse, whereas fellow spin-off Diamond Castle did not. Avista’s second fund closed with $1.8 billion of commitments, which was lower than its original target between $2.5 and $3 billion. The firm cited changes in North American alternative investment strategies for its lower target.

Its third fund closed in 2013 with $1.4 billion in commitments and in 2016 Avista began raising its fourth fund with UBS acting as the placement agent. The fourth fund does not include an energy component and is focused exclusively on healthcare. Fund IV closed in 2017 with $775 million of committed capital. The former Avista energy team spun-out and formed an independent firm AEC Partners in 2017 and began raising their first fund in 2017. In 2021, Avista closed its fifth fund after raising $1.2 billion in capital, above the original target of $775 million.

== Notable investments ==
In 2007, Avista acquired Bristol-Myers Squibb Co.'s medical imaging unit for $525 million. The company, later renamed Lantheus, went public in 2015.

In 2008, Avista, together with Nordic Capital Fund VII, bought ConvaTec, a wound and ostomy care business, from Bristol-Myers Squibb for $4.1 billion. ConvaTec went public on the London Stock Exchange in 2016 and, in 2017, both funds sold approximately 20% of the company to Danish fund Novo.

In 2009, one of Avista's media acquisitions, the Minneapolis Star Tribune newspaper, the nation's 15th-largest daily paper, filed for Chapter 11 bankruptcy.

In 2010, Avista, together with Ontario Teachers’ Pension Plan, purchased INC Research, a contract research organization, and later took the company public in 2012. Avista exited its position in 2016. Together with DLJ Merchant Banking Partners, Nordic Capital and Coller Capital, Avista sold Swiss drug-maker Nycomed for €9.6 billion in cash to Takeda Pharmaceutical Corp. in 2011. Also in 2011, Avista acquired DataBank Ltd., an enterprise-class managed data center based in Dallas, Texas, and sold the company to Digital Bridge Holdings LLC in 2016. Also in 2010, Avista invested in specialty pharmaceutical company OptiNose Inc. Avista took the company public in 2015.

In 2012, Avista, together with Partners Group, purchased Strategic Partners, a manufacturer and marketer of uniforms and footwear to support healthcare professionals, schools, and parents. In 2016, Avista sold the company to New Mountain Capital.

In 2013, Avista acquired a controlling stake in Vertical/Trigen Holdings for an undisclosed price and, in 2015, the company joined forces with Osmotica Pharmaceutical, a specialty pharmaceutical and generics company. Also in 2013, Avista acquired Zest Dental Solutions, a maker of dental products, from the Jordan Company and, in 2018, Avista sold Zest to BC Partners for an undisclosed amount.

In 2016, Avista acquired the contract research organization MPI Research, a provider of testing services for biopharmaceutical and medical devices. Avista sold the company to Charles River Laboratories for approximately $800 million in cash in 2018. In 2017, Avista acquired Express Scripts’ United BioSource division and National Spine & Pain Centers (NSPC) from Sentinel Capital Partners, both for undisclosed sums. Also in 2017, Avista acquired Miraca Life Sciences, a subsidiary of Japanese clinical diagnostics and laboratory testing company Miraca Holdings Inc.

In 2018, Avista contributed to a $110 million round of financing for Braeburn Pharmaceuticals. Also in 2018, Avista, together with Dana Holdings, purchased Kramer Laboratories, an over-the-counter healthcare platform. A month later, Kramer Laboratories acquired Nizoral, an anti-dandruff shampoo brand, from Janssen Pharmaceutical NV, part of Johnson & Johnson. Kramer changed its name to Arcadia in 2019 and went on to acquire Naturelo and the US rights to Kaopectate, both in 2020. In August 2021, Avista sold Arcadia to Bansk Group for a return of approximately 3.7 times its investment.

In December 2018, Avista Healthcare Public Acquisition Corp. (AHPAC) acquired regenerative medicine specialist Organogenesis. As part of the deal, Organogenesis became a wholly owned subsidiary of AHPAC, while Avista invested $92 million in the combined company.

In September 2019, Avista acquired California-based medtech component manufacturer GCM Holding Corp. from May River Capital for an undisclosed amount. Also in 2019, Avista sold Trimb Healthcare, an over-the-counter health-care product business, to Karo Pharma.

In January 2021, Avista acquired Solmetex Inc., a provider of waste compliance products, including amalgam separators, for the American and Canadian dental industries. In March 2021, Avista Capital Partners agreed to buy chemical and bioreagent specialist eMolecules for $250 million.

On June 24, 2025 Avista announced the successful close of Avista Healthcare Partners CV II, L.P., a single-asset continuation fund for GCM, a leading outsourced manufacturer of complex precision components for high-growth medical technology end markets.
