= ABS Capital Partners =

American private equity firm

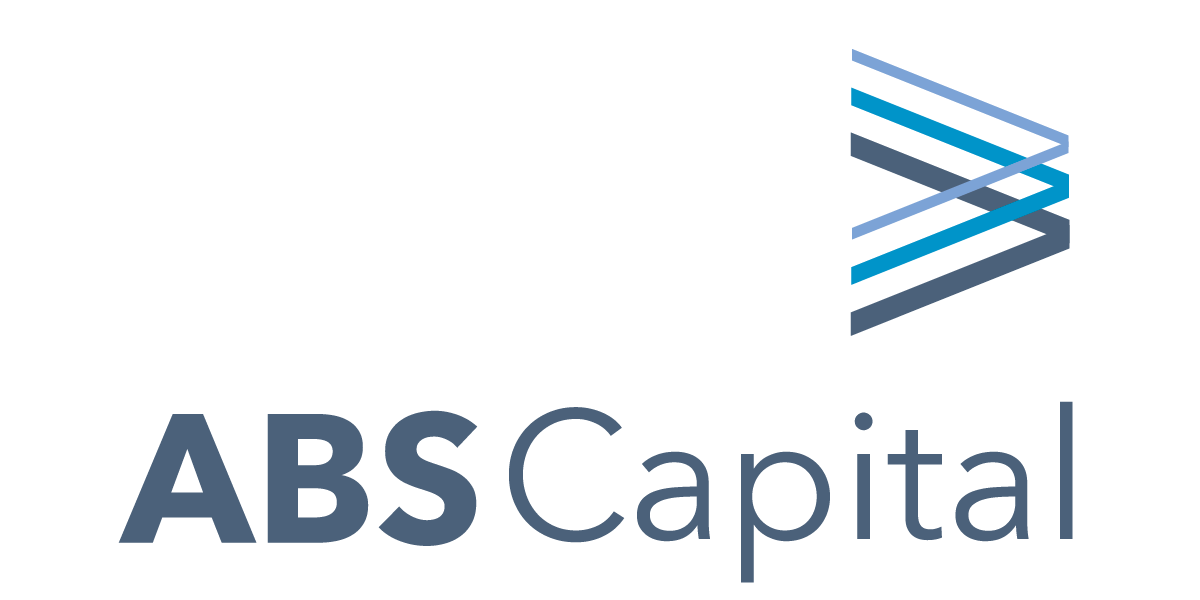
- Type: Private
- Industry: Private equity
- Founded: 1990; 36 years ago
- Founder: Donald Hebb
- Headquarters: 201 International Circle; Hunt Valley, Maryland, United States
- Products: Venture capital Growth capital
- Total assets: $2.1 billion
- Number of employees: 20+
- Website: abscapital.com

ABS Capital Partners is an American private equity firm focused on investments in software and tech-enabled services businesses across a range of industries, including FinTech, Healthcare, EdTech, eCommerce, cybersecurity, and Smart Cities. Founded in 1990, the firm is based in Washington, DC, Baltimore, and San Francisco. The company has raised approximately $2.5 billion since its inception across seven funds. ABS Capital Partners is a member of the National Venture Capital Association.

== History ==
ABS Capital Partners was founded in 1990 and was originally the investment arm of Alex. Brown & Sons (later BT Alex. Brown). The firm's founder, Donald Hebb spent more than 20 years with Alex. Brown where he was CEO from 1986 to 1991, leading the initial public offering in 1986.

In July 1996, ABS purchased a majority stake in the BBN Corporation. In July 1999, ABS invested in Captivate Network. In 2001, ABS invested in Neustar Inc. In May 2002, ABS invested $13 million in Payformance Corp. In February 2006, ABS made an equity investment in Restaurant Technologies Inc.

In 2007, ABS and DCA Capital Partners invested $19.25 million in Superior Vision. In 2012, Nautic Partners LLC bought out both companies to acquire the majority stake in Superior Vision.
