= Onto Innovation =

American semiconductor company

Onto Innovation Inc.
- Type: Public
- Traded as: NYSE: ONTO; S&P 400 component
- Industry: Semiconductor Equipment & Materials
- Predecessors: Nanometrics Incorporated; Rudolph Technologies, Inc.
- Founded: 2019; 7 years ago
- Headquarters: Wilmington, Massachusetts, United States
- Key people: Michael P. Plisinski (CEO)
- Products: Semiconductor wafer processing, Semiconductor final manufacturing, Data storage, Compound semiconductor manufacturing, Flat panel display, Micro-Electro-Mechanical Systems (MEMS) manufacturing, Research and development.
- Revenue: ▲US$1.01 billion (2025)
- Net income: ▼US$137 million (2025)
- Number of employees: c. 1,760 (2026)
- Website: ontoinnovation.com

Onto Innovation Inc. is an American semiconductor company formed in 2019 from the merger of Rudolph Technologies, Inc. and Nanometrics Incorporated. It is a provider of process and process control equipment and software for microelectronic manufacturing industries (primarily semiconductor device manufacturing).

The company's leading-edge technologies include: Un-patterned wafer quality; 3D metrology spanning chip features from nanometer scale transistors to large die interconnects; macro defect inspection of wafers and packages; metal interconnect composition; factory analytics; and lithography for advanced semiconductor packaging.

Onto Innovation is traded on the New York Stock Exchange as NYSE: ONTO.

== History ==
=== Rudolph Research: 1940–1995 ===
Rudolph Technologies, Inc. (RTI) traces its origins to 1940, when Otto Curt Rudolph formed O.C. Rudolph & Sons, Inc. Originally an importer of microscopes and scientific instruments, this RTI predecessor was renamed in October 1970 to Rudolph Research Corporation. The company designed optical equipment for laboratories and universities.

The company Otto Rudolph established continued to evolve, making breakthroughs in ellipsometry including the first production-oriented ellipsometer for thin, transparent film measurements. The company continued development of its metrology products, securing new patents along the way.

=== Nanometrics: 1975–2019 ===
Nanometrics was founded in 1975 and was a pioneer and innovator in the field of optical metrology. In 1984, the company started publicly trading.

=== Formation of Rudolph Technologies: 1996–1999 ===
In June 1996, Richard Spanier, Ph.D., chief executive officer of Rudolph Research, forged a partnership agreement with Boston-based Riverside Partners and New York-based Liberty Partners who, along with others, invested in the company. At that time, Dr. Spanier retired his active role in the company and semiconductor industry veteran Paul F. McLaughlin was named as CEO. In August 1999, the name of the company was changed to Rudolph Technologies, Inc.

In November 1999, RTI made its initial public offering of common stock. Revenues grew dramatically, reaching a record $38.1 million. A new facility opened early in the year, and the company launched a new product, the MetaPULSE® line of copper film measurement tools.

=== Rudolph Technologies: 2000–2019 ===
In July 2002, RTI agreed to acquire the Richardson, Texas-based defect control company ISOA, Inc. A spin-off from Texas Tech University's International Center for Informatics Research, ISOA had been licensing technology to the semiconductor industry for about 16 years, offering defect detection software. The deal was completed in September, with ISOA becoming RTI's Yield Metrology Group.

Several months later, RTI expanded into China by establishing an office in Shanghai's Pudong industrial area. In subsequent years, the company established additional offices in all semiconductor manufacturing regions of the world including Japan, Europe, South Korea, Taiwan and Singapore.

In 2006, a merger was completed with Minnesota-based August Technology Corporation, growing Rudolph's workforce to 550 employees. This acquisition brought Rudolph into the ‘back-end’ of the manufacturing process.

In 2007, the company acquired the semiconductor business of Washington-based Applied Precision LLC, adding probe card test and analysis to the company's portfolio. The acquisition of RVSI Inspection LLC and its Wafer Scanner inspection system was announced in 2008. Adventa Control Technologies, Inc., a provider of process control software, was acquired in 2009, and an acquisition of MKS Instruments, Inc.’s Yield Dynamics business was completed in 2010. Rudolph announced two acquisitions in 2012. NanoPhotonics GmbH, Mainz, Germany (unpatterned wafer inspection); and Azores Corp., Wilmington, MA (Rudolph's entry into the advanced packaging and FPD lithography markets). In 2013, Rudolph announced the acquisition of selected assets of Tamar Technology, Newbury Park, CA, a supplier of 3D metrology technologies. Rudolph acquired the inspection technology of Stella Alliance in 2015, adding patents to enhance its inspection capability.

In November 2015, Rudolph announced the retirement of Paul F. McLaughlin and appointment of Michael P. Plisinski as CEO and Director.

As of January 19, 2017, Rudolph Technologies Inc. had a market capitalization of about $713 million.

In January 2017, Voce Capital Management LLC in a letter to investors, urged merging semiconductor-equipment makers Rudolph Technologies Inc. and Nanometrics Inc. The merger eventually occurred and closed on October 30, 2019. According to the Joint Proxy Statement announcing the terms of the merger, talks began in the first quarter of 2016 and continuing into 2017, Nanometrics and Rudolph engaged in discussions concerning a potential business combination between the two companies, to be structured as a merger of equals transaction, which discussions between the parties are referred to as the 2017 discussions. In connection with the 2017 discussions, in February 2016, Nanometrics and Rudolph entered into a mutual confidentiality agreement, which was subsequently extended in January 2017.

On October 25, 2019, Rudolph merged with Nanometrics Incorporated to become Onto Innovation, trading as NYSE: ONTO.

The company is now headquartered in Wilmington, Massachusetts, with additional U.S. operations in New Jersey, Minnesota, California, Texas, Oregon and Washington.

== Products and services ==
=== Semiconductor fabrication, packaging and testing ===
Semiconductor device fabrication is the process used to create the integrated circuits that are found in commonly used electronic devices and electrical equipment. It is a multiple-step process during which electronic circuits are gradually built by adding elements and layers of material on a substrate made of pure silicon, or various compounds in the case of specialized applications, hundreds of steps performed by specialized process tools are required before the wafer moves to a final packaging facility.

The focus of packaging and assembly is to ensure an electrical connection from the die to the circuit board, to encapsulate the package for mechanical integrity and to withstand thermal variations. The era of slim form-factor devices, such as smart phones, implies high level of functionality in very dense footprint. Due to these requirements, the challenges in packaging, assembly and test have significantly increased and advanced packaging techniques such as bumping or through-silicon via are necessary.
