= Goldman Sachs Alternatives =

Private equity firm

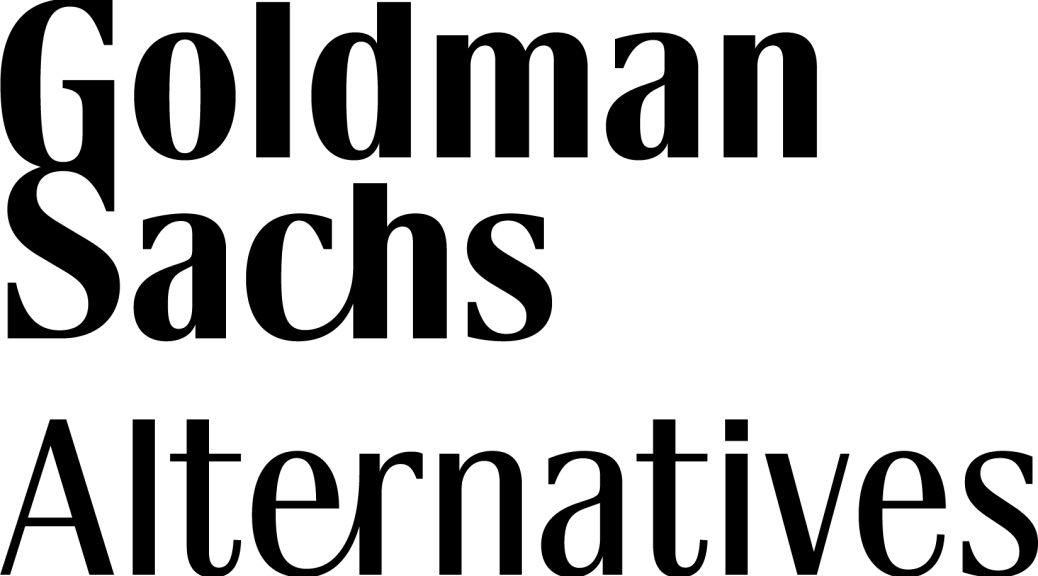
- Type: Subsidiary
- Industry: Alternative investment
- Founded: 1986; 40 years ago
- Headquarters: 200 West Street; New York City, New York, United States
- Products: Private equity; Private credit; Secondaries; Real estate; Infrastructure; Growth equity
- AUM: US$627 billion (December 2025)
- Number of employees: 1,000+
- Parent: Goldman Sachs
- Website: am.gs.com/en-us/institutions/products/alternative-investing

Goldman Sachs Alternatives is the alternative investment business of Goldman Sachs, focused on private equity, private credit, secondaries, real estate, infrastructure, and growth equity investments.

== History ==
Goldman Sachs has historically invested capital in a variety of businesses alongside its investment banking clients. In the early and mid-1980s, Goldman Sachs was a slow entrant into the financing of leveraged buyouts and junk bonds and preferred to focus on its traditional mergers and acquisitions advisory business. Beginning in 1983, however, Goldman Sachs began making longer-term equity investments in private equity transactions that came through its investment banking and other clients.

Goldman Sachs Alternatives was founded in 1986, at the same time that similar groups were founded at other investment banks including Lehman Brothers Merchant Banking and Morgan Stanley Capital Partners. Goldman Sachs established investment partnerships that allowed its clients to participate alongside the firm in private equity transactions.

=== Investment funds ===
Since 1992, Goldman Sachs Alternatives has raised third party capital in addition to investing on behalf of the firm, its clients, and its employees through institutional private equity funds. Goldman Sachs Alternatives’ third party investors include pension funds, insurance companies, endowments, fund of funds, high-net-worth individuals, sovereign wealth funds and other institutional investors.

Fund	Vintage Year	Committed Capital ($m)
GS Capital Partners	1992	$1,104
GS Capital Partners II	1995	$1,750
GS Capital Partners III	1998	$2,780
GS Capital Partners 2000	2000	$5,250
GS Capital Partners V	2005	$8,500
GS Capital Partners VI	2007	$20,300
West Street Capital Partners VII	2016	$7,000
West Street Capital Partners VIII	2022	$9,700
West Street Capital Partners IX	2024	
