= Centerplate =

Centerplate, Inc.
- Industry: Event Hospitality Services
- Headquarters: Stamford, CT, United States
- Key people: Chris Verros, CEO
- Number of employees: 30,000
- Parent: Sodexo
- Website: www.centerplate.com

Centerplate, Inc. is a food and beverage corporation serving entertainment venues in North America, and the UK.

Centerplate, formerly known as Volume Services America, Inc., was originally a division of Canteen Corp. In 1995, it was sold to Flagstar, controlled by private equity firm Kohlberg Kravis Roberts (KKR), which then sold Volume Services to The Blackstone Group after Flagstar filed for Chapter 11 bankruptcy. Volume Services changed its name to Centerplate in 2004 when the company completed an IPO. In 2009, Centerplate again became a private company following its merger with an affiliate of Kohlberg & Company. In 2012, Centerplate was acquired by a consortium of investors including members of the then current management team as well as private equity firm Olympus Partners. In 2017, Centerplate was acquired by food services company Sodexo.

== Venue Partners ==
Centerplate provides services to various venues in the United States, Canada and the United Kingdom, including arenas, cinemas, convention centers, resorts, restaurants, zoos and aquariums.
