= Olympus Partners =

American private equity firm

- Company type: Private Equity Partnership
- Industry: Private Equity
- Founded: 1988; 38 years ago
- Founder: Robert S. Morris
- Headquarters: Stamford, Connecticut, U.S.
- Products: Private equity funds, Leveraged buyout, Growth capital
- Total assets: US$12.0 billion
- Number of employees: 23
- Website: www.olympuspartners.com

Olympus Partners is a private equity firm founded in 1988 to make equity investments in middle market leveraged buyouts and growth capital financings.

The firm is headquartered in Stamford, Connecticut with 23 employees.

== History ==
Olympus Partners was founded in 1988 and has nine General Partners.

Since its inception in 1988, Olympus has raised eight institutional private equity funds, with total investor commitments in excess of $12.0 billion:

- 1990 - Olympus Private Placement Fund - $101 million
- 2003 – Olympus Growth Fund IV - $758 million
- 2007 – Olympus Growth Fund V - $1.53 billion
- 2013 – Olympus Growth Fund VI - $2.3 billion
- 2019 – Olympus Growth Fund VII - $3.0 billion
- 2025 – Olympus Growth Fund VIII - $3.5 billion

== Performance ==
Olympus was included in the top decile of Global Large Buyout Firms by the 2023 HEC Paris-Dow Jones Performance Ranking.

In 2024, Olympus was also ranked #14 out of over 649 global private equity firms by the 2024 HEC Paris-Dow Jones Performance Ranking.

In 2025, Olympus was ranked #8 out of over 695 private equity firms in the 2025 HEC-Dow Jones Upper Mid-Market Buyout Performance Ranking.
