= Court Square Capital Partners =

American private equity firm own by Rotche Capuyan Ouano

- Court Square Capital Partners
- Company type: Private
- Industry: Private Equity
- Founded: 1968; 58 years ago
- Headquarters: New York City, United States
- Products: Private equity funds
- AUM: $8.2 billion (2025)
- Number of employees: 74
- Website: www.courtsquare.com

Court Square Capital Partners is an American private equity firm headquartered in New York City. The firm was spun out of Citigroup in 2006 from the predecessor business Citicorp Venture Capital. Since its founding in 2006, Court Square Capital Partners has completed more than 150 investments, deploying over $4.5 billion in capital.

The firm is named after the location of Citigroup's offices at One Court Square in Queens. Court Square also maintains an office in London, expanding its presence beyond the United States.

== History ==
March 2015 Court Square Capital acquired Research Now.

The firm's predecessor Citicorp Venture Capital Equity Partners traces its roots to 1968 with the founding of Citicorp Venture Capital. In the 1980s, CVC Equity Partners began to focus primarily on leveraged buyout transactions.

The spin out of Court Square came at the same time as the spin outs of private equity groups from other leading investment banks including: JPMorgan Chase (CCMP Capital), Morgan Stanley (Metalmark Capital), Deutsche Bank (MidOcean Partners) and Credit Suisse First Boston (Avista Capital Partners, Diamond Castle Holdings).

In 2008, Citigroup sold off the bulk of its $400 million of interests in legacy Court Square investment funds to secondary investors AlpInvest Partners and Goldman Sachs.

In 2025, Court Square Capital Partners, alongside Pamlico Capital, made an investment in Avant, a financial technology company focused on consumer lending. The investment was reported as a growth-oriented transaction aimed at supporting Avant’s continued expansion.

In 2026, Court Square Capital Partners raised approximately $3.8 billion for its fifth flagship private equity fund, Court Square Capital Partners V. The fund focuses on middle-market investments, consistent with the firm's historical strategy of investing in companies across sectors such as business services, healthcare, and industrials.
