= Auldbrass Partners =

American private equity secondaries firm

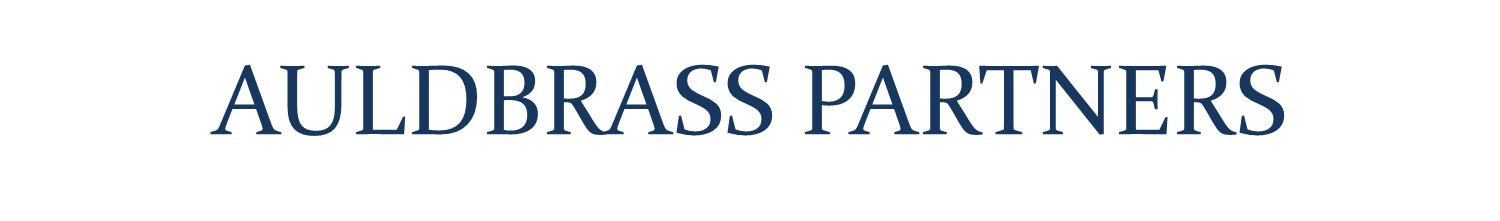
- Industry: Private Equity
- Founded: New York, USA (2011; 14 years ago)
- Founder: Howard Sanders
- Headquarters: New York City
- Areas served: North America, Europe
- Products: Private Equity Secondaries
- Website: www.auldbrasspartners.com

Auldbrass Partners is a private equity secondaries firm, founded by Howard Sanders, which spun-out from Citigroup in 2011. Auldbrass Partners has advised/managed over $1.2 billion of global investments in growth buyout, growth equity, mezzanine and venture capital primarily in U.S. and European-based funds. Auldbrass Partners acquires secondary interests through both LP transactions and GP-led opportunities. Auldbrass Partners is headquartered in New York. Auldbrass is a 100% employee owned, Minority-owned Business Enterprise (MBE).

== Investments ==
Auldbrass Partners seeks concentrated positions in excellent companies with strong sustainable growth and resilience that can be reasonably expected to achieve liquidity in 3-5 years. Auldbrass Partners has a company focused, data driven approach which targets gross returns of 2.0x MOIC and 20%+ IRRs. Through both direct GP and intermediated relationships built over decades of successful investing, Auldbrass Partners has established a network of 200 funds and 300 general partner/limited partner relationships from which it sources its deals.[3] Auldbrass Partners team members have completed over $5 billion (500 fund transactions) of transactions.

== Recent Events ==
In April of 2019, Auldbrass Partners completed the final close for Secondary Opportunity Fund II at $185.6 million, which includes $92.9 million of co-investments. Auldbrass Partners closed its Secondary Opportunity Fund I in December 2014; the Fund has not specified a target hard cap. The fund seeks to invest in private equity and hedge fund secondaries globally

== See also ==
Auldbrass Partners Website

SecondaryLink Profile
