= Cowin Capital =

China-based investment firm

Cowin Capital Group
- Native name: 同创伟业集团
- Type: Public company
- Traded as: NEEQ: 832793
- Industry: Investment management
- Founded: 26 June 2000; 26 years ago
- Founders: Zheng Weihe "Alex"; Huang Li
- Headquarters: Shenzhen, China
- Products: Private Equity; Venture Capital
- AUM: US$4.7 billion (2022)
- Website: cowincapital.com.cn

Cowin Capital (Cowin; Chinese: 同创伟业; pinyin: Tóngchuàng Wěiyè) is a Chinese investment firm based in Shenzhen, China. According to South China Morning Post, from January 2019 to May 2020, it was the tenth most active venture capital firm in China.

== History ==
On 26 June 2000, Cowin was founded by Zheng Weihe and his wife, Huang Li using their own funds of RMB 80 million during the dot-com bubble. Zheng was previously a lawyer and had also worked at the Shenzhen Stock Exchange which gave him experience and contacts in handling initial public offerings (IPO).

In 2007, Cowin raised its first fund of RMB 50 million. Between 2007 and 2011, Cowin expanded rapidly raising five funds and RMB 4 billion in total. Cowin's funds had a shorter tenure of five years compared to 10 years which was common among their western counterparts.

Cowin's investment strategy was to look for "hidden champions" in "rising sectors" which were high growth companies that could lead their sectors in three to five years. Cowin would then use its expertise and contacts to guide these companies to an IPO.

In July 2015, Cowin became a publicly listed company on the National Equities Exchange and Quotations. According to its 2015 annual report, 90% of its income came from fund management fees.
