= Conquest Asset Management =

Conquest AM
- Company type: Private limited liability company
- Industry: Asset management
- Founded: 2010
- Headquarters: Ireland
- Website: Conquest AM Web page

Conquest Asset Management is an independent asset management services firm, part of Conquest Group founded in 2010 and owned by its directors. Its head-office is incorporated in Ireland and it also has a registered office and was founded in Luxembourg while its executive team and most employees are in France.

== History ==
It focuses on investment in and management of infrastructure assets, usually on the so-called "core+" and "value added' assets mainly in the sustainable energy, transport and digital industries, usually at late stage of development, prior to construction and also throughout operations of the assets. In 2017, it launched a fund in the climate change mitigation and renewable energy sector.

In May 2017, it announced the acquisition of a portfolio of solar assets from Engie group. In September 2018, it announced the financing of its renewables portfolio . In October 2018, it announced the acquisition of an on-shore wind portfolio .
