= Axiom Asia =

Private equity investment firm

- Industry: Private equity
- Founded: 2006
- Headquarters: Singapore
- Products: Fund of funds Equity co-investment fund
- Total assets: US$7 billion
- Website: www.axiomasia.com

Axiom Asia Private Capital is a private equity investment firm, focusing exclusively on the Asia Pacific region. The firm was established in 2006 and currently manages seven separate funds, with a total commitment of over $7 billion. The founders previously worked at GIC Private Ltd. The investment firm has offices in Singapore and Taipei and Shanghai.

Axiom has held positions in numerous Asian companies such as Alibaba, JD.com and Vipshop. The investor base for Axiom includes endowments, foundations, family offices, pensions and financial institutions.

== Investment strategy ==
Axiom invests specifically in mid-market companies mainly via country-specific funds. Axiom seeks to invest in buyout, venture capital, and growth capital funds. The firm also has a co-investment strategy that increases its funds' direct exposure in specific geographies and sectors. Private equity secondaries are also an important investment focus for Axiom. Working with managers, Axiom regularly acquires fund positions and direct secondaries.

== History & notable transactions ==
- 2006 - Axiom Asia was formed.
- 2007 - Axiom closed its first Fund at $440 million, which was above the original target of $350 million.
- 2010 - Axiom closed Fund II with a total investment of $950 million, above the initial target of $750 million.
- 2012 - Axiom closed Fund III at $1.15 billion.
- 2016 - Axiom Asia IV raised a total of $1.03 billion, with an initial target of $750 million.
- 2018 - Axiom Asia announced it had completed fundraising for a fifth fund in December 2018, with a total commitment of $1.4 billion.
- Axiom also announced Co-investment Fund I, which had a total commitment of $210 million.
- 2019 - Axiom was listed by Preqin as one of the Best Performing Funds of Funds in Private Equity.
- Axiom Asia was also listed as one of Preqin's best performers in the Largest ASEAN-Based Private Equity Funds category.
