= Metalmark Capital =

American private equity firm focused on leveraged buyout

Metalmark Capital Partners
- Formerly: Morgan Stanley Capital Partners (1985–2004)
- Type: Subsidiary
- Industry: Private equity
- Founded: 1985; 41 years ago
- Founder: Howard Hoffen (chairman and CEO)
- Headquarters: New York, New York, United States
- Key people: Kenneth Clifford (partner and CFO)
- Products: Leveraged buyout, Growth capital
- Total assets: $8.5 billion
- Number of employees: 25+
- Parent: Morgan Stanley (1985–2004); Citi Alternative Investments (2007–present)
- Website: www.metalmarkcapital.com

Metalmark Capital, formerly Morgan Stanley Capital Partners is a private equity firm focused on leveraged buyout investments in middle-market companies across a range of industries. Metalmark was acquired by Citigroup Alternative Investments in December 2007.

The firm, which is based in New York City, traces its roots back to 1985. Metalmark was founded as an independent firm in 2004. The firm has raised approximately $8.5 billion since inception across four funds at Morgan Stanley and one fund raised since the firm's spinout.

== History ==
From 1985 to 2004, Morgan Stanley Capital Partners invested over $7 billion through four funds. Morgan Stanley Leveraged Equity Fund I was raised in 1985 followed two years later by Morgan Stanley Leveraged Equity Fund II, which was raised in 1987 with $2.2 billion of investor commitments. In 1991, the group raised $1.87 billion of investor commitments for Morgan Stanley Capital Partners III. The most recent fund, Morgan Stanley Capital Partners IV was raised in 1999 with total commitments of $3.3 billion.

In 2004, the Morgan Stanley Capital Partners team began preparations to separate itself from Morgan Stanley. The spinout of MSCP came at the same time as the spinouts of private equity groups from other leading investment banks including: JPMorgan Chase (CCMP Capital), Citigroup (Court Square Capital Partners), Deutsche Bank (MidOcean Partners) and Credit Suisse First Boston (Avista Capital Partners, Diamond Castle Holdings).

Previous logo

In December 2007, Metalmark was acquired by Citigroup Alternative Investments as one of a series of investments in merchant banking and hedge funds by the bank's CEO Vikram Pandit. Citigroup's middle market private equity group, CVC Equity Partners had completed a spinout from Citigroup in 2006 to form Court Square Capital Partners. Citigroup disposed of its remaining interest in Court Square following the purchase of Metalmark.
