= Riverside Partners =

American investment firm based in Boston

Riverside Partners, LLC
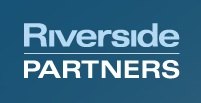
- Company type: Private Partnership
- Industry: Financial services
- Founded: 1989; 37 years ago
- Headquarters: Boston, Massachusetts, U.S.
- Products: Private equity Mezzanine capital funds
- AUM: US$700 mil (December 2011)
- Website: www.riversidepartners.com

Riverside Partners is an American investment firm, specializing in private equity, based in Boston. Riverside Partners develops and manages private equity investment products in middle market healthcare and technology companies. Founded in 1989, Riverside Partners has managed more than $700 million in investments in over 55 companies. The firm is currently focused on companies with revenues between $20 –$200 million and with $5 – $25 million of EBITDA.

== Investment funds ==
Between 1988 and 2011, Riverside Partners has developed five funds investing more than $1 billion in targeted healthcare technology companies.

- Riverside Fund I, LP (closed)
- Riverside Fund II, LP (closed)
- Riverside Fund III, LP (closed)
- Riverside Fund IV, LP (closed) – $406,000,000
- Riverside Fund V, LP (closed) - $561,000,000

=== Investments ===
Riverside Partners’ investments in medical device, software and technology companies include more than a dozen current engagement and nine closed sales.

- Applied Precision (acquired)
- Barrier Safe Solutions International (acquired)
- Bike24
- Cushcraft (acquired)
- MicroCal (acquired)
- MicroDental (acquired)
- Quantum Medical Imaging (acquired)
- Rudolph Technologies, Inc. (IPO)
- Vocollect (acquired)
- Dominion Diagnostics
- Eliassen
- GEM Engineering
- Health Drive
- IPA
- ITC Global
- Logically
- Max Vision
- NDS Surgical Imaging
- Pilgrim Software
- Real Goods Solar
- Tech Valley Communications
- Tegra Medical
- Thinklogical
- Weblocalize

== Key employees ==
- David Belluck, General Partner
- Brian Guthrie, General Partner
- John Lemelman, General Partner
- Steve Kaplan, General Partner
- Kevin Sullivan, Chief Financial Officer
