= ZWC Partners =

Asian venture capital firm

- Native name: 众为资本
- Company type: Private
- Industry: Private equity Venture capital
- Founded: 2015; 11 years ago
- Founder: Patrick Cheung
- Headquarters: Hong Kong
- AUM: US$2.5 billion (2024)
- Website: www.zwcpartners.com

ZWC Partners (ZWC; Chinese: 众为资本; pinyin: Zhòngwèi Zīběn) is an Asian private equity and venture capital firm. The firm focuses mainly on technology investments in China and Southeast Asia (SEA).

== Background ==
ZWC was co-founded in by 2015 by Patrick Cheung with a group of friends he described as successful entrepreneurs. He was previously a technology entrepreneur that had founded several companies and made his fortune after his outdoor advertisements business merged with Focus Media in 2007.

ZWC Partners adopts a diversified limited partnership structure. Since establishment, ZWC has paid special attention to the selection of limited partners for its funds which included not just large financial institutions but also other entrepreneurs and startup firms. The aim was not just to obtain capital but also other resources which would help grow the projects. ZWC Partners has also jointly established a consumer research institute with Focus Media.

In May 2019, Tech in Asia reported that ZWC was planning to expand into SEA with a plan to invest US$300 million over the next three years. The focus would be on Indonesia and Vietnam. The first SEA fund raised $150 million. To build up technical talent in SEA, ZWC created a venture builder program named Zynergy that functioned in a similar manner to Y Combinator where it would provide financial, operational and strategic support to startups.

Despite the COVID-19 pandemic having a significant effect on financial institutions, it did not have an effect on ZWC's investment pace. ZWC raised more than $774 million in USD and RMB-denominated funds during the pandemic.

Notable investments made by ZWC include 4Paradigm, Boss Zhipin, Mobike, VIPKid, XPeng, Horizon Robotics, Yitu Technology and GoTo.
