= Jiangxiaobai =

Chinese liquor brand

- Type: Baijiu
- Manufacturer: Jiangji Distillery
- Origin: China, Baisha, Chongqing
- Introduced: 2012
- Alcohol by volume: 25.0%-52.0%
- Website: www.jiangjidistillery.com

Jiangxiaobai (Chinese: 江小白; pinyin: jiāng xiǎo bái) is a Chinese light-aroma baijiu brand that produces grain spirits with focus on the market of young adults.

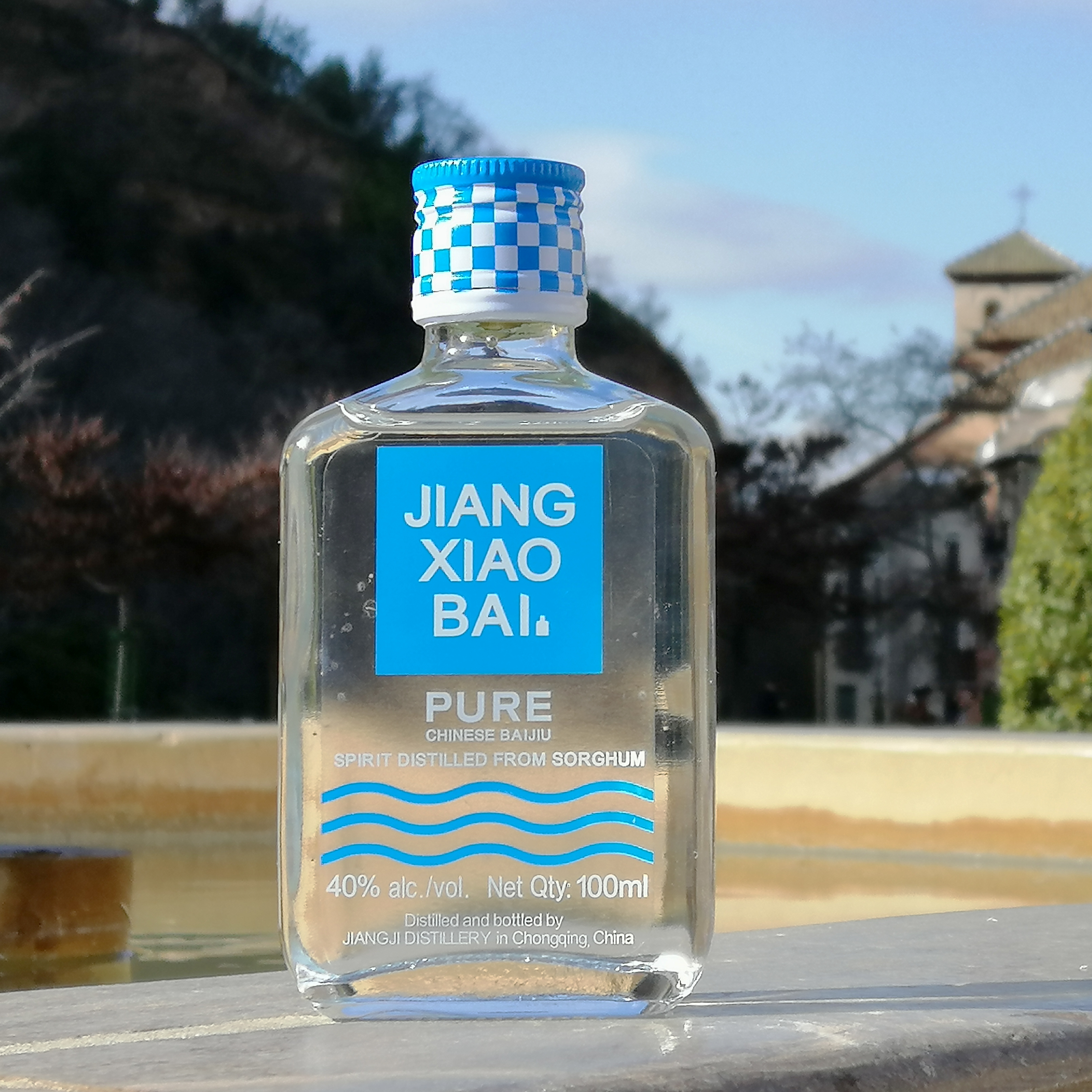
Jiangxiaobai bottle of the PURE series

== History ==
Jiangxiaobai was introduced in 2012 by Jiangji Distillery in the Jiangjin District of Chongqing, China.

In 2019, the brand entered the Indian market.

In 2020, the company has raised about $300 million from investors in a fresh funding round, according to people familiar with the matter. China Renaissance Holdings Ltd. led the funding round for the company. Baillie Gifford & Co. and China Merchants Bank International Capital Corp. were also among the investors who participated in the round.

== Production ==
Jiangji Distillery produces clear spirits made from Gaoliang (sorghum) that comes from company-owned farms and water from the river Yangtze. Inherited techniques such as solid-state fermentation in stone pits and use of fermentation starter xiao qu, as well as modern distillation are all applied before optional aging in ceramic jars. To prepare the sorghum grains for fermentation, they need to be soaked in hot water, steamed, and cooled back to room temperature. The microorganisms in xiao qu enable saccharifaction of the grains' starches. Jiangxiaobai specializes in mild aromas with typically lower alcohol content than conventional baijius.

== See also ==
- Baijiu
- Alcoholic drinks in China
