= Trivest =

American private equity firm

- Company type: Corporation
- Industry: Private Equity
- Founded: 1981; 45 years ago
- Headquarters: Miami, Florida, United States
- Products: Private equity fund, Growth capital
- Total assets: $6 billion Assets under management
- Number of employees: 100+
- Website: trivest.com

Trivest Partners is a private equity firm based in Coral Gables, Florida. Founded in 1981, Trivest focuses exclusively on investments in founder- and family-owned businesses across North America. The firm is one of the oldest private equity groups in the southeastern United States.

Trivest maintains a presence in Chicago, Denver, Los Angeles, New York, Toronto, and Charlotte, North Carolina.

Trivest specializes in partnering with founders through flexible transaction structures and its “Just Say No” program, which seeks to eliminate common pain points founders experience in private equity partnerships. The firm is generally industry-agnostic but frequently invests in the business services, consumer, healthcare, value-added distribution, and niche manufacturing sectors.

Since its founding, Trivest has completed investments in more than 500 companies. As of 2025, the firm manages approximately $6 billion in assets under management (AUM) across multiple fund families.

== Investment Platforms ==
Trivest currently invests across four primary fund families:

- Trivest Discovery Fund II ($600M) – Focused on majority buyouts, targeting smaller founder-owned businesses in fragmented industries, with $1.0M-4.0M of EBITDA.
- Trivest Mid-Market Fund VII ($950M) – Focused on majority buyouts of established founder-led businesses with $4.0M-15.0M of EBITDA.
- Trivest Recognition Fund ($1.3B) – Focused on majority buyouts, targeting larger founder-led businesses, with more than $15.0M of EBITDA.
- Trivest Growth Investment Fund III (TGIF III, $750M) – Focused on minority/non-control growth investments founder-led businesses, with more than $4.0M of EBITDA.

Notable transactions under these funds include the acquisitions of Province, a restructuring and advisory firm, and Applied Value Group, a management consulting business.

== Leadership and Senior Team ==
As of 2025, Trivest’s leadership team includes the following Managing Partners and Partners:

- Jamie Elias – Managing Partner, Trivest Growth Recognition Fund
- David Gershman - Managing Partner, General Counsel
- Jorge Gross Jr. – Managing Partner, Recognition Fund
- Forest Wester – Managing Partner, Mid-Market Fund
- Russ Wilson – Managing Partner, Discovery Fund
- Brian Connell - Partner, Discovery Fund
- Todd Jerles - Partner, Operations
- Amir Mirheydar - Partner, Trivest Growth Recognition Fund
- Steve Reynolds - Partner, Mid-Market Fund

== Selected Prior Investments ==
Over its history, Trivest has invested in or exited more than 70 platform companies. Notable prior portfolio companies include: Turnpoint Services, National Carwash Solutions, MGT, Front Row Group, Pave America, Big Truck Rental, HighGround, ScanSTAT, Oil Changers, Lamark Media, AM Conservation, Ellery Homestyles, Group III International, Hazmasters, National Auto Care, Pelican Water Systems, Take 5 Oil Change, and North Star Seafood, among others.

Recent exits include the 2025 sale of Unosquare, a nearshore software development company.
