= CoStone Capital =

China-based investment firm

CoStone Asset Management Co., Ltd
- Native name: 基石资产管理股份有限公司
- Company type: Private
- Industry: Investment management
- Founded: 2001; 25 years ago
- Headquarters: Shenzhen, Guangdong, China
- Key people: Zhang Wei (Chairman)
- Products: Venture Capital; Private equity M&A; Private placement
- AUM: US$11.6 billion (July 2024)
- Website: www.stonevc.com

CoStone Capital (CoStone; Chinese: 基石资本; pinyin: Jīshí Zīběn) is a Chinese investment firm headquartered in Shenzhen. The firm focuses on venture capital and private equity investments.

== Background ==
CoStone was founded in 2001 as one of the earliest investment firms in China at the time.

Since its establishment, CoStone's rationale for selecting industries to invest in depends on the general direction of China's economic development. Therefore, its core investment areas have always been industries that can achieve high growth. It is considered taboo to simply follow the current trends and chase what is currently popular. A focused approach is taken rather than diversified approach to investing which allows CoStone to obtain high returns by limiting the number of companies to invest in. When selecting companies, CoStone believes they should have no black boxes with regards to core technologies and the founding team should be able to serve customers without issues. Rather than financials or macroeconomics, importance is placed on a company's behavior and management. CoStone has developed its own technology investment team consisting of experienced individuals from the industry to understand core technologies of companies better.

The firm uses a partnership structure to curb investment risks.

In the early 2000s, CoStone made investments in the construction machinery industry. This came after China became a member of the World Trade Organization in 2001 leading to heavy industrialization of the country. By 2009 while China continued industrialization, CoStone took the initiative to invest in more advanced fields such as technology and healthcare. For example, CoStone invested in SenseTime in 2016 when artificial intelligence had only started being exposed to the public such as the games from AlphaGo versus Lee Sedol.

As of 2021, 40% of CoStone's capital had been invested in technology companies with multiple projects being listed on the Shanghai Stock Exchange STAR Market. Notable investments include OmniVision Technologies, Mindray, MGI, 4Paradigm, CloudWalk Technology and Royole. CoStone also held a 15% stake in Morgan Stanley's China joint venture, Morgan Stanley Huaxin Funds which it sold to Morgan Stanley in 2021.
