= William Blair & Company =

American multinational independent investment bank and financial services company

- Company type: Privately held
- Industry: Financial services
- Founded: 1935
- Founder: William McCormick Blair
- Headquarters: 150 North Riverside Plaza, Chicago, Illinois, United States
- Area served: Worldwide
- Key people: Brent Gledhill (President and CEO); Michael Trimberger (CFO)
- Products: Investment banking and wealth management
- Number of employees: 1,400+
- Website: williamblair.com

William Blair & Company ("William Blair") is an American multinational independent investment bank and financial services company focusing on investment banking, investment management, and private wealth management. The firm currently reports $17 billion of reportable assets and 1,700 open positions.

The firm, which opened in 1935, is independent and employee-owned, operating in more than 20 offices with headquarters in Chicago, Illinois. The firm has had six CEOs or managing partners, three of whom continue to work at the firm. Brent Gledhill, who has served as president and CEO since 2022, heads the firm's executive committee.

== See also ==
- List of investment banks
- Boutique investment bank
