= SABA (clothing) =

- Industry: Retail
- Founded: 1965
- Founder: Joe Saba
- Headquarters: Alexandria, Sydney, Australia
- Number of locations: 103
- Area served: Australia
- Key people: Peter Halkett (executive chair)
- Products: Apparel, footwear, accessories
- Owner: John Marshall and Andrew Michael
- Number of employees: 500+
- Parent: APG & Co
- Website: www.saba.com.au

SABA is an Australian fashion brand created by Joe Saba in 1965. The brand began as The Joseph SABA Shirt Shop on Flinders Lane in Melbourne.

The brand carries a contemporary label for both women's and menswear lines. SABA have taken part in such fashion events as Australian Fashion Week and the L'Oreal Melbourne Fashion Festival. In 1996 the brand won the Australian Fashion Menswear Award and was inducted as the Powerhouse Museum's Fashion House of the Year.

In 2002, Joe Saba sold the brand to Daniel and Danielle Besen, owners of the fashion labels Sportsgirl and Sussan. In 2005, SABA was acquired by the Apparel Group and shortly moved its head office to Sydney. Today, the brand owns 30 stand-alone stores throughout Australia and is also available at selected David Jones department stores.
