= Private equity firm =

Firm that invests in companies

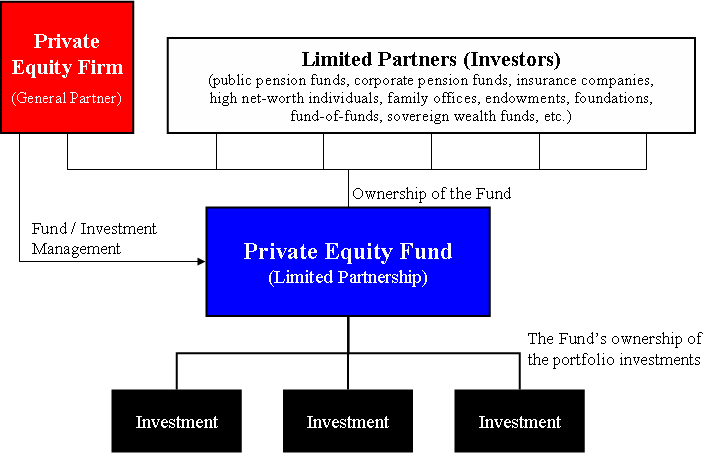
Diagram of the structure of a generic private equity firm

A private equity firm or private equity company (often described as a financial sponsor) is an investment management company that provides financial backing and makes investments in the private equity of a startup or of an existing operating company with the end goal to make a profit on its investments. The target companies are generally privately owned (not publicly listed), but on rare occasions a private equity firm may purchase the majority of a publicly listed company and delist the firm after the purchase.

To complete its investments, a private equity firm will raise funds from large institutional investors, family offices and other pools of capital (e.g. other private equity funds) which supply the equity. The money raised, often pooled into a fund, will be invested in accordance with one or more specific investment strategies including leveraged buyout, venture capital, and growth capital. Although the industry has developed and matured substantially since it was invented, there has been criticism of private equity firms because they have pocketed huge and controversial profits while stalking ever-larger acquisition targets.

== History ==
The history of private equity firms has occurred through a series of boom-and-bust cycles since the middle of the 20th century with significant growth since the 1980s. Private equity firms provided large early investments in several successful start-up companies such as Microsoft, Dell, and Genentech. Within the broader private equity industry two distinct sub-industries, leveraged buyouts and venture capital, grew along parallel tracks.

In its early years through to roughly the year 2000, the private equity and venture capital asset firms were primarily active in the United States. With the second private equity boom in the mid-1990s and liberalization of regulation for institutional investors in Europe, a mature European private equity market emerged.

In 1999, British Prime Minister Tony Blair called for more British pension funds to be invested in private equity, leading to an increase in British pension investment in private equity over the next eight years.

== Business model ==
Private equity companies, acting as general partners with investors as limited partners, acquire a controlling or substantial minority position in a company and then look to maximize the value of that investment. Strategies include leveraged buyout (with borrowed capital), venture capital (for start ups), and growth capital (mature companies).

Private equity firms generally receive a return on investment through one of the following avenues:

- an initial public offering (IPO) — shares of the company are offered to the public, typically providing a partial immediate realization to the financial sponsor as well as a public market into which it can later sell additional shares;
- a periodic management fee as well as a share of the profits earned (carried interest) from a private-equity fund managed;
- a recapitalization — cash is distributed to the shareholders (in this case the financial sponsor) and its private-equity funds either from cash flow generated by the company or through raising debt or other securities to fund the distribution;
- a merger or acquisition — the company is sold for either cash or shares in another company.

== Effects ==
Concerns have been raised regarding the financial health of private equity-backed companies. The Bank of England issued a warning in 2024, stating that businesses owned by private equity firms were more vulnerable to default than other large businesses. The central bank's research found that more than 2 million people in the UK were employed by firms engaged with private equity and that these companies were responsible for 15% of all corporate debt. A report the same year by Moody's Ratings found that globally, companies backed by the twelve largest private equity firms were twice as likely to default as companies not backed by private equity, with more than half of the companies backed by Platinum Equity and Clearlake Capital at heightened risk of default.

Private equity firms' interest in short-term profits without regard for the long-term effects and the ability to "make money even if their companies blow up" can also lead to job loss, raised prices, and asset stripping for companies acquired. Trade unionists have raised concerns about private-equity-related wage and job cuts, and non-governmental organizations have raised concerns about the loss of transparency when previously public companies become private. Private equity firms have purchased a large number of previously nonprofit hospices in the US, resulting in a decline in the quality of care.

== Major firms ==
According to Private Equity International's PEI 300 ranking, the largest private equity firms include The Blackstone Group, Kohlberg Kravis Roberts, EQT AB, Thoma Bravo, The Carlyle Group, TPG Capital, Advent International, Hg, General Atlantic, Warburg Pincus, Silver Lake, Goldman Sachs Alternatives, and Bain Capital.

These firms are typically direct investors in companies, focusing primarily on leveraged buyouts, rather than investors in the broader private equity asset class, and for the most part the largest private equity investment firms focused primarily on leveraged buyouts rather than venture capital.

== See also ==
- History of private equity and venture capital
- List of private-equity firms
- Management buyout
