= Growth capital =

Type of private equity investment

Growth capital (also called expansion capital and growth equity) is a type of private equity investment, usually a minority interest, in relatively mature companies that are looking for capital to expand or restructure operations, enter new markets or finance a significant acquisition without a change of control of the business.

Companies that seek growth capital are often small, rapidly growing, and their assets are often intangible. They will often do so to finance a transformational event in their lifecycle. These companies are likely to be more mature than venture capital funded companies, able to generate revenue and profit but unable to generate sufficient cash to fund major expansions, acquisitions or other investments. Because of this lack of scale, these companies generally can find few alternative conduits to secure capital for growth, so access to growth equity can be critical to pursue necessary facility expansion, sales and marketing initiatives, equipment purchases, and new product development.

Growth capital can also be used to effect a restructuring of a company's balance sheet, particularly to reduce the amount of leverage (or debt) the company has on its balance sheet.

Growth capital is often structured as preferred equity, although certain investors will use various hybrid securities that include a contractual return (i.e., interest payments) in addition to an ownership interest in the company. Often, companies that seek growth capital investments are not good candidates to borrow additional debt, either because of the stability of the company's earnings or because of its existing debt levels.

== Providers ==
Growth capital resides at the intersection of private equity and venture capital and as such growth capital is provided by a variety of sources. The types of investors that provide growth capital to companies span a variety of both equity and debt sources, including private equity and late-stage venture capital funds, family offices, sovereign wealth funds, hedge funds, Business Development Companies (BDC), and mezzanine funds. Growth capital investments are also made by more traditional buyout firms. Particularly in markets where debt is less available to finance leveraged buyouts or where competition to fund startup businesses is intense, growth capital becomes an attractive alternative.

The largest growth equity investment companies include Insight Partners, General Atlantic, and TPG Growth.

== Investing approach ==
Growth equity investments, as defined by the National Venture Capital Association, feature the following:

- Company's revenues are growing rapidly.
- Company is cash flow positive, profitable or approaching profitability.
- Company may be founder-owned and often has no prior institutional investment.
- Investor is agnostic about control and purchases minority ownership positions more often than not.
- Industry investment mix is similar to that of venture capital investors.
- Capital is used for company needs or shareholder liquidity and additional financing rounds are not usually expected until exit.
- Investments are unlevered or use light leverage at purchase.
- Investment returns are primarily a function of growth, not leverage.

== See also ==
- Convertible bond
- Mezzanine capital
- Working capital
- Growth buyout
