= AlpInvest Partners =

Private equity asset manager

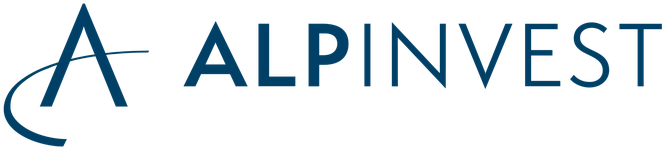
- Type: Subsidiary
- Industry: Private Equity
- Predecessor: NIB Capital
- Founded: 1999; 27 years ago
- Headquarters: New York, New York; Amsterdam, Netherlands; London; Hong Kong; Indianapolis, Indiana; Tokyo
- Products: Fund investments, Secondaries, Co-Investments, Alternative Credit
- Total assets: ▲$85 billion (December 31, 2024) ▲350 private equity managers (December 31, 2024) ▲800+ private equity funds (December 31, 2024)
- Number of employees: 260 (2024)
- Parent: The Carlyle Group
- Website: www.AlpInvest.com
- Footnotes; US$100+ billion in capital since inception

AlpInvest Partners is a global private equity asset manager with over $85 billion of assets under management as of December 31, 2024. The firm invests on behalf of more than 500 institutional investors from North America, Asia, Europe, South America and Africa.

AlpInvest operates through three core investment teams:

- Primary Fund Investments
- Secondary and Portfolio Finance investments
- Co-Investments.

AlpInvest's investments span a broad spectrum of private market strategies including: large buyout, middle-market buyout, private credit, venture capital, growth capital, mezzanine, distressed and energy investments, including sustainable energy investments.

As of the end of 2024, the firm had invested in more than 800 private equity funds managed by more than 350 private equity firms. According to the PEI 300, AlpInvest ranked among the 50 largest private equity firms globally.

Since 2011, AlpInvest has operated as a subsidiary of The Carlyle Group, a global private equity firm. Prior to 2011, AlpInvest has been owned through a joint venture of its two clients, the Dutch pension funds, ABP and PGGM (later PFZW).

Founded in 1999, AlpInvest has offices in New York, Amsterdam, London, Hong Kong, Indianapolis, Singapore and Tokyo with over 100 investment professionals and over 260 employees.

== Investment Strategies ==
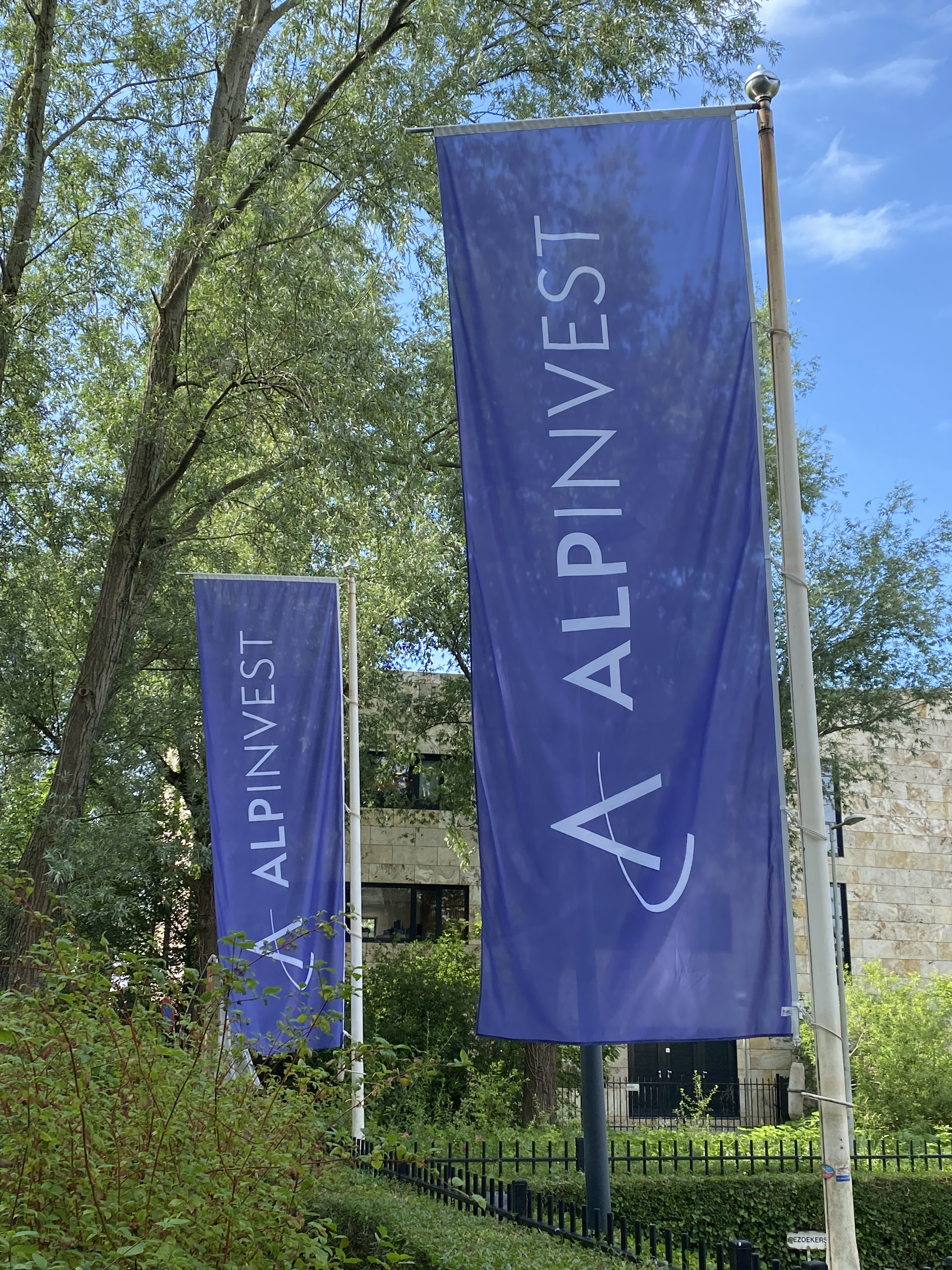
The company flag outside its office in Amsterdam

With over $85 billion of funds under management, AlpInvest is one of the largest investors in the private equity asset class globally. AlpInvest pursues investment opportunities across the entire spectrum of private equity including: large buyout, middle-market buyout, venture capital, growth capital, mezzanine, distressed and sustainable energy investments. AlpInvest also invests across the range of private equity investment channels:

- Primary fund investments
- Secondaries & Portfolio Finance
- Co-investments

AlpInvest invests primarily in private equity limited partnerships and effectively acts as a fund investor, making commitments to private equity funds globally. Among the most notable firms with which AlpInvest is invested include: Hellman & Friedman, TA Associates, Thoma Bravo, CVC Capital Partners, Leonard Green & Partners, Silver Lake, HG Capital, TPG Capital and Advent International as well as many of the leading middle-market private equity, private credit, and venture capital firms.

AlpInvest will invest with these firms either by making commitments to new investment funds or by purchasing funds through the private equity secondary market. AlpInvest is one of the largest private equity fund investors and is also among the largest and most active and experienced investors in private equity secondaries.

AlpInvest also invests directly alongside some of the largest private equity investors through an active co-investment program and will make mezzanine debt investments into companies owned by financial sponsors.

Following this spin-off of its European middle market leveraged buyout platform, which was subsequently renamed Taros Capital AlpInvest, by itself, no longer makes control investments directly in privately held companies, but rather invests alongside selected private equity managers.

== History ==
The logo used by AlpInvest from 2004 through 2019

The logo used by Alpinvest N.V., a publicly quoted investment vehicle and predecessor of AlpInvest Partners

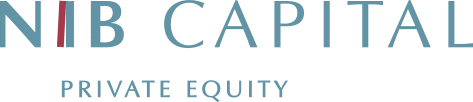
The logo used by NIB Capital Private Equity, the direct predecessor of AlpInvest Partners

AlpInvest's predecessor, NIB Capital Private Equity, formed in 1999 as the outsourced private equity investment arm of its two sponsors, the Dutch pension funds ABP and PGGM (later renamed PFZW). Their original intention was to create an independent and professional manager for their private equity allocations.

Beginning in 2000, AlpInvest expanded its investment platform, by creating three dedicated investment teams to invest in funds managed by its core private equity managers or in leveraged buyouts as co-investors alongside these managers. In 2002, AlpInvest launched its Secondaries strategy, which has emerged as one of the largest buyers of private equity assets in the secondaries market across LP interest secondaries, GP-led secondaries and portfolio financings.

AlpInvest was acquired by The Carlyle Group in 2011 and as of the end of 2024 has grown to over $85 billion of assets under management with over 550 investors.

=== Foundations and Predecessors ===
During the 1980s, AlpInvest's original Dutch pension fund sponsors (ABP and PGGM), independently established their own in-house private equity investment programs. These programs focused on investing primarily in private equity funds, laying the groundwork for their future role as major institutional investors in the asset class.

Meanwhile, in the early 1990s, Alpinvest Holding N.V. was founded as an evergreen investment fund to provide private equity and mezzanine capital to middle-market companies in the Benelux region and Germany. Stan Vermeulen was appointed CEO in 1993, and the firm gained prominence as a key investor in European private equity. By 1997, Alpinvest Holding N.V. began trading on the Amsterdam Stock Exchange on June 11, 1997. Major shareholders included the Dutch government and ABN AMRO Bank NV. In 2000, ABP and PGGM acquired Alpinvest Holding N.V. and merged it into Parnib Holding N.V. and NIB Capital Private Equity. This consolidation resulted in the creation of AlpInvest Partners, a dedicated private equity asset manager. The acquisition was a competitive process, with ABP and PGGM outbidding GIMV to gain full control. As a result, this original Alpinvest Holding was not directly related to today's AlpInvest Partners.

By 1999, ABP and PGGM, which had previously employed a series of fund-of-funds, sought to consolidate and expand their private equity investments, leading to the formation of NIB Capital Private Equity. The firm, initially led by Volkert Doeksen, Paul de Klerk, Erik Thysssen and Wim Borgdorff, was created by integrating investment teams from NIB Bank NV and Parnib Holding NV. This initiative was designed to strengthen the pension funds' position in the private equity market.

=== Expansion and New Investment Mandates in the Early 2000s. ===
Along with its formation, NIB Capital received its first investment mandate of €13 billion from ABP and PGGM, with €7 billion designated for new investments between 2000 and 2002. The remainder consisted of assuming management of existing private equity investments made by ABP, PGGM, and NIB Capital’s predecessors.

In 2001, AlpInvest expanded internationally by opening an office in New York, marking the firm’s entry into the North American market. By 2002, the firm had launched a dedicated secondary investment strategy with a €1 billion mandate, focusing on acquiring existing private equity fund interests.

In 2003, ABP and PGGM reaffirmed their commitment to AlpInvest by granting a €7 billion investment mandate covering primary fund investments, secondary investments, co-investments, and lead investments in the Benelux and German mid-market.

=== Transition to AlpInvest Partners ===
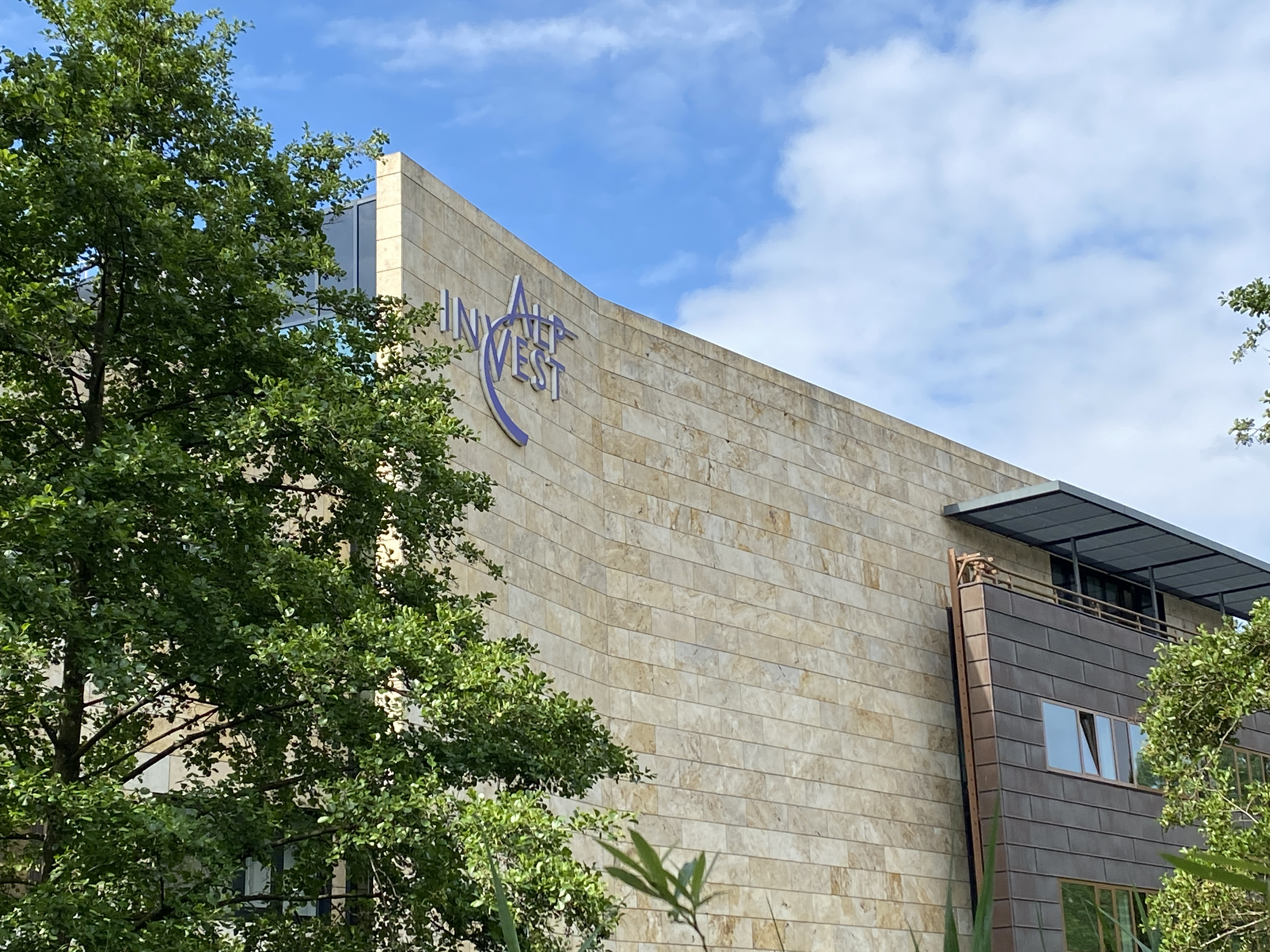
AlpInvest's offices in Amsterdam

In 2004, NIB Capital Private Equity was spun out from ABP and PGGM and was renamed AlpInvest Partners. The pension funds, ABP and PGGM retained 100% ownership of AlpInvest until 2011.

Following the spinout, in 2005 the firm underwent strategic restructuring by spinning off its European middle-market buyout division, which was subsequently renamed Taros Capital. That same year, ABP and PGGM sold their interests in NIB Capital Bank to JC Flowers.

Expansion and Diversification during the 2000s. Now a semi-independent firm, in 2006, AlpInvest secured an €11 billion investment mandate from ABP and PGGM, covering the period from 2006 to 2008. This was one of the largest private equity mandates ever granted in the global market. As part of this growth in assets under management, in 2006, AlpInvest expanded into Asia by opening its first office in Hong Kong. In 2008, the firm also strengthened its European presence by opening an office in London.

AlpInvest continued its growth and further expanded its investment focus into private credit in 2007, further by securing a €2 billion mandate for global mezzanine debt transactions and an additional €500 million for Cleantech investments covering 2007–2009.

=== Carlyle Group Acquisition and Institutional Growth ===
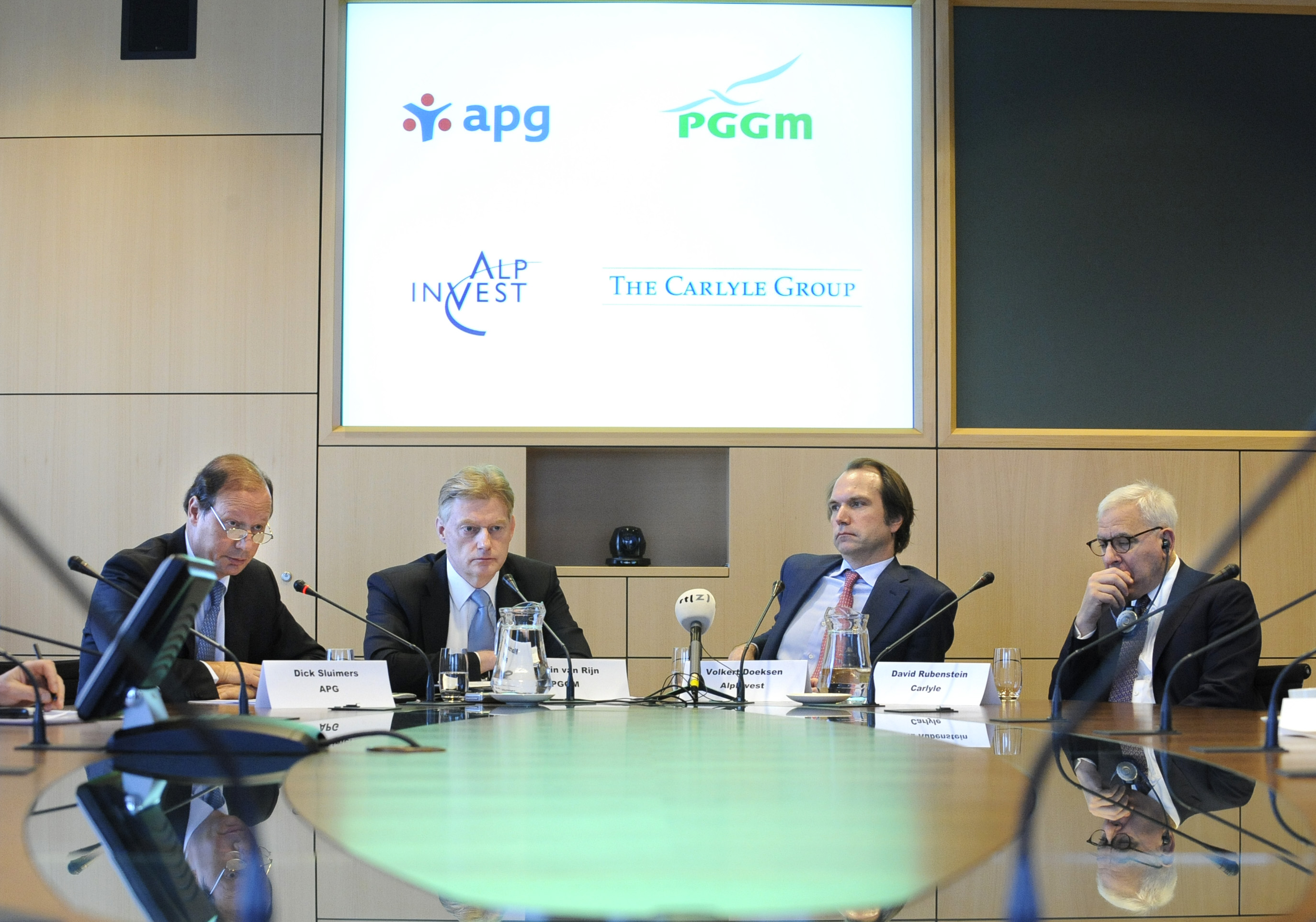
Press conference announcing the creation of a joint venture with The Carlyle Group.

In 2011, AlpInvest completed its spinout from its two Dutch pension clients through a management buyout completed by a strategic joint venture between AlpInvest management and The Carlyle Group. The transaction allowed AlpInvest to raise capital from new investors for the first time.

By 2013, AlpInvest had successfully raised $4.2 billion for AlpInvest Secondaries Fund V. Later that year, The Carlyle Group acquired the remaining 40% of AlpInvest, making it a fully owned subsidiary. Carlyle's acquisition of the remaining stake in AlpInvest was part of formation of a new Solutions division that also encompassed the acquisition of Metropolitan Real Estate and Diversified Global Asset Management.

In 2019, AlpInvest completed a strategy venture capital investment in the technology company Chronograph, which provides of portfolio monitoring and reporting solutions for institutional private capital investors. AlpInvest led the Series A round alongside Nasdaq

AlpInvest continued to attract new investor commitments through a series of new investment funds, reinforcing its position as a leading private equity investor:

- In 2017, the firm raised $6.5 billion for AlpInvest Secondaries Fund VI.
- In 2020, AlpInvest secured $9 billion for AlpInvest Secondaries Fund VII.
- In 2021, the firm raised $3.5 billion for AlpInvest Co-Investment Fund VIII.

In 2022, AlpInvest also reportedly reorganized elements of its Secondaries business to focus on credit secondaries and portfolio finance. AlpInvest further expanded into Portfolio Finance in 2024 with a $2 billion fund focused on credit oriented investments. AlpInvest also completed a $1 billion securitization, known as a Collateralized fund obligation in 2024.

== Primary Fund Investments ==
AlpInvest is among the largest investors in private equity funds, globally, historically allocating as much as $2–3 billion per year to leveraged buyout (large-cap, middle-market, lower middle market), venture capital and special situations funds, among other strategies. AlpInvest maintains relationships with many of the leading managers in difficult to access segments of private equity. In many cases, AlpInvest is a strategic investor and tends to be among the largest investors in each fund in which it invests. AlpInvest's funds team is made up of more than 25 professionals based globally in Europe, North America and Asia.

As of the end of 2022, the firm had invested in more than 600 private equity funds managed by more than 325 private equity firms. According to the PEI 300, AlpInvest ranked among the 50 largest private equity firms globally.

== Secondary Investments ==
AlpInvest's secondary investments group focuses on acquiring existing portfolios of private equity assets. The firm operates as an independent investment group with a dedicated team, positioning itself as one of the largest and most active buyers in the private equity secondary market.

AlpInvest engages in various types of secondary transactions, including purchases of limited partnership interests, spin-outs of captive private equity groups, stapled secondary transactions, securitizations, joint ventures, and secondary direct transactions. While many of its transactions remain confidential, several notable deals have been publicly disclosed.

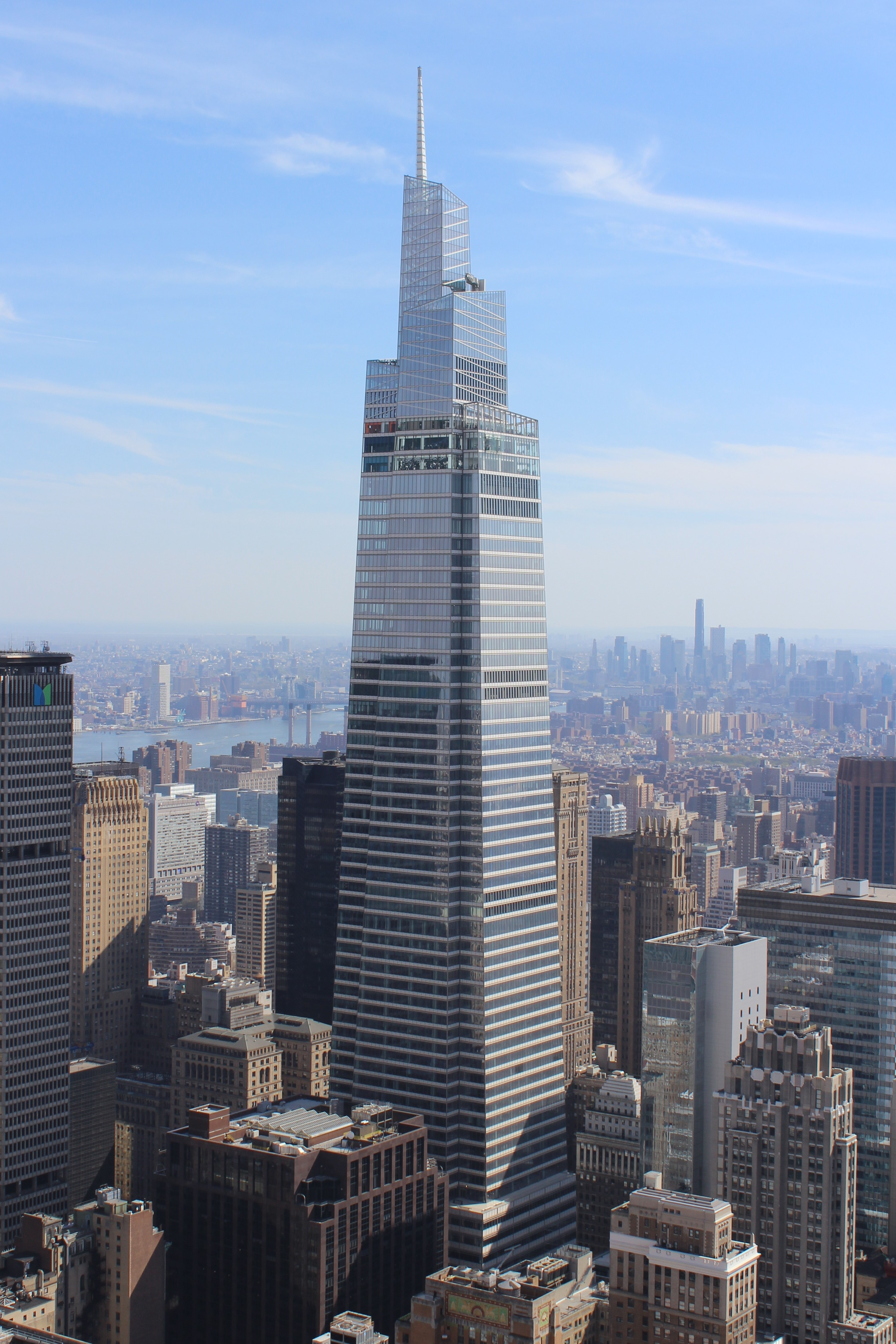
AlpInvest's New York offices are based in One Vanderbilt

=== Early Transactions ===
A major early transaction in the secondary market was its role as a lead investor in the €1.5 billion divestiture of Deutsche Bank’s direct and co-investment private equity portfolio. The deal, which involved over 100 underlying companies, resulted in the spin-out of MidOcean Partners, establishing one of the largest secondary market transactions of its time.

The firm joined forces with Lexington Partners to acquire a $1.2 billion portfolio from Dayton Power & Light, consisting of 46 private equity fund interests. At the time, this was among the largest private equity secondary transactions completed. Around the same time, AlpInvest and AXA Private Equity acquired a cornerstone interest in West Private Equity, later renamed Lyceum Capital from WestLB, while also committing capital to Lyceum Capital's second fund.

In an innovative move, AlpInvest collaborated with Swiss Re and Horizon 21 to structure a managed secondary fund-of-funds transaction. This deal involved leveraging a fund portfolio to optimize cash flow while maintaining investment exposure. AlpInvest and Swiss Re acted as key investors, while Horizon 21 managed the fund and UBS advised the seller. Around the same period, the firm played a key role in securitization transactions, underwriting the equity of a $500 million vintage fund-of-funds, comprising approximately 40 private equity partnerships, in a joint venture with Swiss Re and Horizon 21. Additionally, AlpInvest was a lead investor in the underwriting of an $800 million collateralized fund obligation securitization of 46 private equity fund interests held by Temasek, the Singaporean sovereign wealth fund in the first Astrea transaction.

Another significant transaction involved partnering with Goldman Sachs Alternatives and the Canada Pension Plan to acquire a $1.5 billion portfolio of 32 European companies managed by AAC Capital Partners, previously held by ABN AMRO.

After the 2008 financial crisis, AlpInvest was an active acquiror of private equity fund stakes from institutional investors, most notably CalPERS. AlpInvest acquired interests in various large buyout funds including Kohlberg Kravis Roberts, Silver Lake Partners, The Carlyle Group and Apollo Global Management.

=== Since 2012 ===
As part of the shifting landscape of private equity ownership following the implementation of the Volker Rule, AlpInvest was actively involved in the acquisition of private equity assets from various bank balance sheets. The firm partnered with Ridgemont Equity Partners, in an $800 million spinout if its private equity assets from Bank of America in 2012. Similarly, AlpInvest acquired the cornerstone limited partnership interest in private equity funds managed by Pamlico Capital, valued at over $650 million, from Wells Fargo in 2014. AlpInvest also led the $2 billion spin-off of One Equity Partners from JPMorgan Chase. As part of the deal, AlpInvest and Lexington Partners acquired part of JP Morgan's stake in One Equity, which then became an independent firm known as OEP Capital Advisors LP. More recently, in 2023, AlpInvest led a consortium to acquire approximately $2 billion of private equity investments managed by Norwest Equity Partners from Wells Fargo. The transaction was part of Wells Fargo’s initiative to refocus on its core banking operations. The sale included stakes in Norwest Equity Partners and Norwest Mezzanine Partners.

Beginning in the 2010s, AlpInvest emerged as one of the earliest players in the development of GP-led secondaries. In 2016, AlpInvest partnered with Lee Equity Partners to lead a milestone $1.2 billion secondary fund recapitalization transaction. The deal involved buying out investors in a 2008 fund managed by Lee Equity, which had been founded by legendary private equity investor Thomas H. Lee.

In 2020, following the COVID-19 pandemic AlpInvest was active in the active GP-led secondaries market. AlpInvest led a $1.7 billion continuation fund for Audax Group, alongside Lexington Partners and Hamilton Lane. The transaction involved acquiring key assets from Audax Private Equity Fund IV and providing additional capital to support the continued growth of its portfolio companies. Around the same time, AlpInvest backed the $700 million spinout of Assured Health Partners from Assured Guaranty (formerly BlueMountain).

In 2023, AlpInvest partnered with Kinderhook Industries, a middle-market private equity firm, to lead a $1.3 billion continuation fund transaction. The deal involved recapitalizing nine portfolio companies while allowing existing investors to achieve liquidity and providing $300 million in unfunded capital for future growth. AlpInvest had already completed two previous transactions with Kinderhook in 2000 and 2022.

AlpInvest has been an active player in structured secondary market transactions with global financial institutions. Among these transactions, the firm has played a significant role in structuring and underwriting secondary funds for Manulife Investment Management. Manulife partnered with AlpInvest to complete a $1.7 billion managed fund transaction, purchasing a portfolio of private equity funds and co-investments primarily in middle-market buyouts in North America. The fund, called Manulife Private Equity Partners LP, was underwritten by AlpInvest and syndicated to investors, providing exposure to diversified private equity assets. Building on this success, AlpInvest partnered with Manulife again in 2024 to form, Manulife Private Equity Partners II, at approximately $810 million. The managed fund structure was seeded through the secondary purchase of an existing portfolio of private equity fund interests and co-investments, selected by AlpInvest. The portfolio consists of fund stakes and co-investments in North American buyout funds with over 30 private equity managers.

In a notable transaction, AlpInvest launched a $2.3 billion joint venture with Northwestern Mutual Capital, acquiring a large portfolio of private equity fund stakes while simultaneously supporting Northwestern Mutual’s co-investment program. The transaction represents a strategic approach that allows limited partners to capture liquidity from their private equity programs at a time when exit activity in the market has been slow. By structuring the deal, the arrangement enabled Northwestern Mutual to reallocate capital while maintaining exposure to high-quality private equity assets and underscored AlpInvest's ability to structure complex transactions that provide both liquidity and long-term strategic benefits.

The firm has also been an active participant in major secondary transactions with financial institutions in Asia, including leading a managed fund transaction with Ping An Insurance to transfer a portfolio of buyout and growth stakes from North American and European managers into a new $850 million fund, alongside Montana Capital Partners.

These transactions reflect AlpInvest’s role as a strategic secondary market player, facilitating large-scale liquidity solutions and capital formation for institutional investors seeking to optimize their private equity portfolios.

== Co-Investments ==
AlpInvest traditionally invests alongside leading financial sponsors in leveraged buyouts and growth capital transactions. Since its inception, the firm has participated in nearly 400 co-investment transactions representing over $18 billion of committed capital. The firm's dedicated co-investment team consists of more than 30 professionals, operating on a global basis.

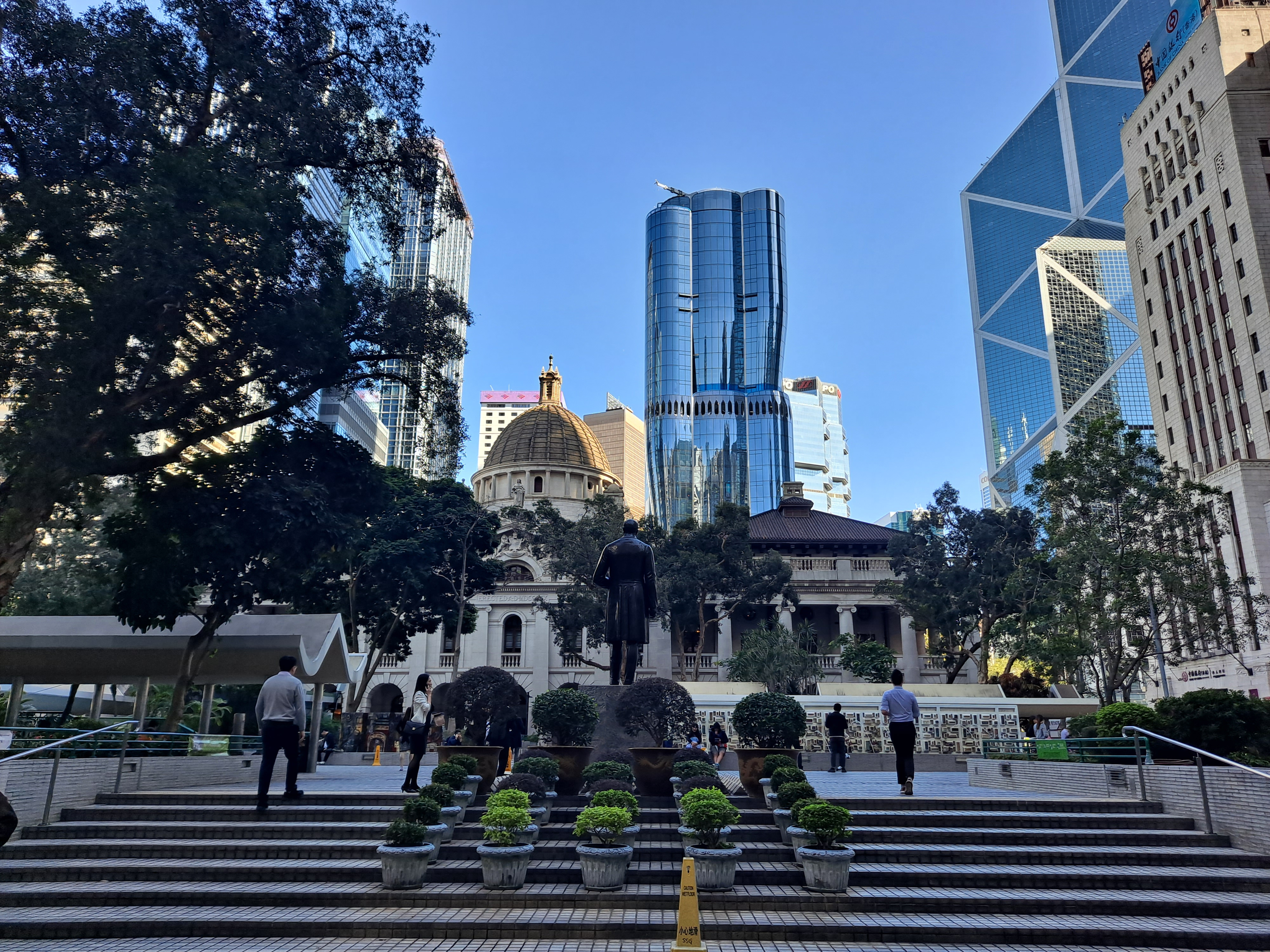
AlpInvest's Hong Kong offices are located in The Henderson

Among AlpInvest’s earliest co-investments was its involvement in the leveraged buyout of Fairmount Food Group in 2003, in partnership with GTCR Golder Rauner. That same year, the firm participated in the buyout of Jostens, a leading producer of high school and college class rings, in a transaction led by DLJ Merchant Banking Partners, Investcorp, and MidOcean Partners. In 2004, AlpInvest co-invested in the buyout of AMC Theatres, alongside J.P. Morgan Partners and Apollo Global Management, marking one of the largest cinema acquisitions in North America. The same year, it participated in the acquisition of Masonite International, a leading manufacturer of doors and door components, in a deal led by KKR.

Between 2005 and 2006, AlpInvest took part in several high-profile transactions. The firm co-invested in the acquisition of Avago Technologies, the semiconductor division of Hewlett-Packard, led by KKR and Silver Lake Partners. It also backed the buyout of Capio, a European healthcare provider, in partnership with Apax Partners, and participated in the acquisition of CEVA Logistics, formerly TNT Logistics, in a transaction led by Apollo Global Management. Additionally, the firm co-invested in NXP Semiconductors, a Philips semiconductor spin-off, in partnership with KKR and Silver Lake Partners.

Another major co-investment during this period included the buyout of Visma, a Norwegian company providing enterprise resource planning and customer relationship management software and services. AlpInvest partnered with HgCapital to support the acquisition.

By 2007, AlpInvest had significantly expanded its co-investment portfolio, taking part in the buyouts of major corporations across various industries. Notable investments included the acquisitions of Alliance Boots, a British pharmaceutical and retail chain, alongside KKR, and Dollar General, a leading discount retail chain, in a deal involving KKR and Goldman Sachs Alternatives. The firm also participated in the acquisition of Nuveen Investments, an investment management company, in a deal led by Madison Dearborn.

Another significant transaction in 2007 included the acquisition of Warner Chilcott, a specialty pharmaceutical company producing branded prescription products in women's healthcare and dermatology. AlpInvest co-invested alongside CCMP Capital, Bain Capital, DLJ Merchant Banking Partners, and THL Partners.

In 2008, AlpInvest expanded its investments into infrastructure and industrial companies. The firm participated in the buyout of Expro, a British oil and gas well management company, in a transaction led by Candover and Goldman Sachs. That same year, it backed the acquisition of The Weather Channel by Blackstone Group, Bain Capital, and NBCUniversal.

AlpInvest remains an active participant in global co-investments, partnering with leading private equity firms to support leveraged buyouts and growth capital transactions across diverse industries. The firm continues to deploy significant capital alongside its financial sponsors, solidifying its position as a key co-investor in the private equity market. Since the firm's acquisition by Carlyle in 2011, AlpInvest has not publicly disclosed its investments.

In recent years, AlpInvest has entered into strategic partnerships to deploy co-investment capital on behalf of large institutional investors most notably creating a partnership with CalSTRS in 2018.

== Portfolio Finance ==
AlpInvest has expanded its investment capabilities beyond traditional secondary transactions into the growing field of Portfolio Finance. This strategy provides credit-oriented liquidity solutions, including NAV lending, financings of private equity firm management companies, and capital solutions for portfolios of private equity fund LP interests. It also encompasses credit secondaries, purchases of portfolios of private credit assets.

The portfolio finance strategy formally launched in 2018 and has since grown into a key business segment within AlpInvest’s broader secondaries and private equity platform. In 2022, AlpInvest reorganized elements of its secondaries business to focus more on credit secondaries and portfolio finance. This strategic shift was driven by increasing demand for customized financing solutions in private equity markets. The following year, AlpInvest launched a $2 billion fund dedicated to credit-oriented investments. The fund, AlpInvest Strategic Portfolio Finance Fund II, secured $947.8 million in commitments during its initial fundraising phase, with a final close expected in September 2024. As part of its expansion, AlpInvest partnered with Mubadala Investment Company in 2024 to establish a portfolio senior fund financing platform. The initiative is designed to provide structured credit solutions to private equity funds worldwide, catering to the increasing need for liquidity and capital solutions in private markets. This partnership builds on Mubadala and AlpInvest’s long-standing relationship, reinforcing their commitment to fund-level lending solutions.

By 2024, the firm had spearheaded approximately $4 billion in portfolio fund financing transactions, solidifying itself as an early leader in the sector.

Further expanding its investment strategies, AlpInvest successfully closed a $1 billion Collateralized Fund Obligation (CFO), marking the largest publicly rated GP-led CFO in the market to date. AlpInvest continues to be a key player in the secondary market, executing large-scale transactions and offering liquidity solutions for investors globally.

== Investors and beneficiaries ==
As of December 31, 2024, AlpInvest manages approximately $85 billion of assets under management from more than 550 investors globally. AlpInvest's investors are largely institutional investors including pension funds, sovereign wealth funds, insurance companies, endowments, and family offices. As of December 2024, AlpInvest reported over 550 investors in its various investment funds.

Prior to 2011, AlpInvest had historically been the exclusive private equity investment manager of the pension funds Stichting Pensioenfonds ABP (ABP) and Stichting Pensioenfonds Zorg en Welzijn (PFZW, formerly PGGM), both based in the Netherlands. At the time of AlpInvest's 2011 spinout, ABP and PFZW collectively had assets of over $500 billion (as of December 31, 2012) among the largest pension funds in the world.

Prior to the 2011 spinout AlpInvest was precluded from soliciting capital from other investors or institutions. However, following its spinout from the Dutch pension funds, AlpInvest has been actively raising capital from institutional investors in North America, Europe, Asia, South America and Africa.

Among AlpInvest's most notable publicly disclosed U.S. clients are CalSTRS, Municipal Employees' Retirement System of Michigan (MERS) and Indiana Public Retirement System (INPRS).

=== Awards ===
In recent years, AlpInvest has won several industry awards as a limited partner and secondary investor.

Year	Award	Publication	Ref.
2023	Secondaries Firm of the Year in Europe	Private Equity International	
2022	Secondaries Deal of the Year in Europe (Deutsche Private Equity Continuation Fund)	Private Equity International	
2021	Secondaries Deal of the Year in Europe (Astorg Continuation Fund for IQ-EQ)	Private Equity International	
2021	Secondaries Deal of the Year in the Americas (Clearlake Capital Continuation Fund for Ivanti)	Private Equity International	
2019	Secondaries LP Sale of the Year in the Americas (Manulife)	Private Equity International	
2019	Secondaries GP-led Deal of the Year in Europe (PAI Partners Continuation Fund for Froneri)	Private Equity International	
2017	Secondaries Firm of the Year in the Americas	Private Equity International	
2017	Secondaries Deal of the Year in Europe (Investindustrial Continuation Fund)	Private Equity International	
2014	Best LP Global Strategy	Private Equity Exchange	
2013	Secondaries Firm of the Year	Private Equity International	
2013	Fund of Funds of the Year	Private Equity International	
2012	#1 Largest Private Equity Fund of Funds	Towers Watson, Financial Times	
2008	Limited Partner of the Year	Private Equity International	
2008	Most Influential European Limited Partner	Private Equity News	
2007	Limited Partner of the Year	Private Equity International	
2007	Most Influential European Limited Partner	Private Equity News	
2007	Buyout of the Year: VNU (Co-Investment)	Thomson Financial's Acquisitions Monthly	
2006	Limited Partner of the Year	Private Equity International	
2006	Large Investment of the Year: NXP (Co-Investment)	Financial News	
2005	Limited Partner of the Year*	Private Equity International	

* This award was initiated in 2005. AlpInvest was the first recipient.

== See also ==
- Private Equity
- Fund of funds
- Secondaries
- NAV lending
- Co-Investment
- Distressed investments
- ESG
- Growth capital
- Leveraged buyout
- Limited partner
- Private credit
- Mezzanine capital
- Venture capital
- Sustainable energy
