= Stichting Pensioenfonds ABP =

Pension fund for government employees in the Netherlands

Stichting Pensioenfonds ABP (National Civil Pension Fund)

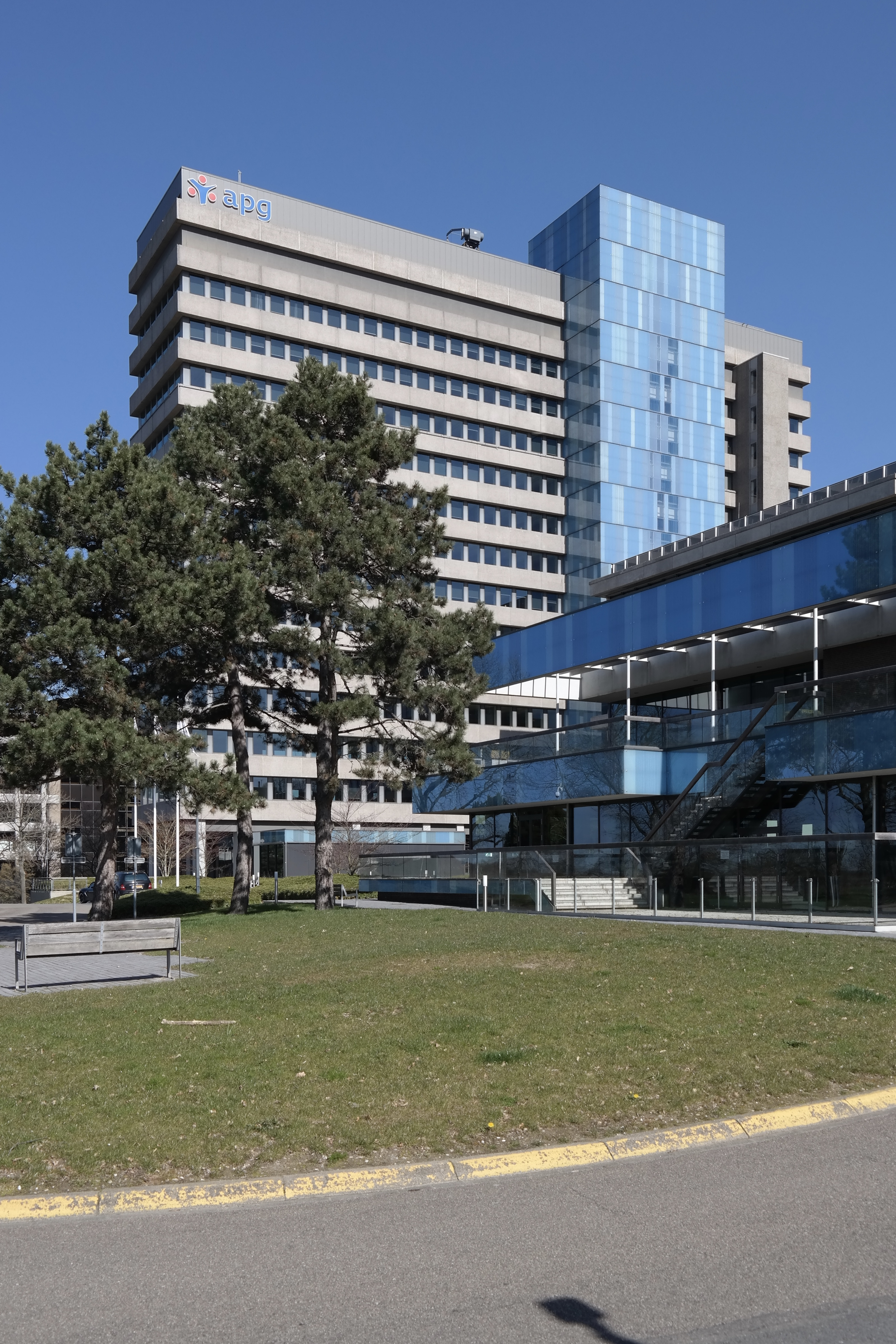
- Head office in Heerlen
- Type: Foundation
- Industry: Pension fund
- Founded: 1922; 104 years ago
- Headquarters: Heerlen, Netherlands
- Products: Pension, Financial services
- Total assets: €532 billion ($615 billion) (2025)

Stichting Pensioenfonds ABP ("National Civil Pension Fund"), frequently referred to as ABP, is the pension fund for government and education employees in the Netherlands. For the quarter ended 31 December 2014, ABP had 2.8 million participants and assets under management of €344 billion ($388 billion, 1 EUR=1.13 USD), making it the largest pension fund in the Netherlands and among the five largest pension funds in the world as of September 2016.

ABP's predecessor, the Algemeen Burgerlijk Pensioenfonds ("Dutch Civil Servants Pension Fund"), was established in 1922, following the adoption of the superannuation act, which regulated the pensions of civil servants. Originally, the pension fund was a government controlled entity that fell under the authority of the minister of home affairs in The Hague. In January 1996, ABP was privatized although its primary function remains unchanged.

Since 1 March 2008, ABP's subsidiary APG administers the ABP pension scheme.

ABP is headquartered in Heerlen, Netherlands. On 1 January 2015, Corien Wortmann-Kool took the chair as Chairman of the Board.

== Pensions ==
The pensions supplement statutory benefits such as the old age pension AOW, surviving dependents' pension, and incapacity benefits. If the participant stops working between the ages of 60 and 70, they receive the ABP Multi-Option Pension. If the participant dies, their partner and children may receive an ABP Survivor's Pension. If the participant becomes unfit for work, the government will pay incapacity benefits under the Work and Income (Ability to Work) Act (WIA); ABP can supplement these benefits with an incapacity pension.

Since 1 January 2004, ABP pensions are based on average salaries during the course of the pensioners’ careers. This is known as an average-salary scheme. As a transition measure, benefits accrued before 2004 are based on the salary on 1 January 2004. Only members of the armed forces now have pensions based on their final salaries.

Both contributions and accrual of benefits are based on the salary minus a threshold (2008: €10,100 per year). The reason for the threshold is the fact that the pension is a supplement to the AOW, etc.

== Investments ==
ABP manages the bulk of its investments in-house through its captive investment unit APG, a privately owned investment manager. APG operates as a subsidiary of Stichting Pensioenfonds ABP and was formerly known as ABP Investments.

In 2006, ABP and PGGM, another large Dutch pension fund, considered a spinoff of their investment management businesses. The two pension funds coordinate their activities in private equity through AlpInvest Partners, one of the largest investors globally in the private equity asset class. Recently, AlpInvest Partners was acquired by the Carlyle group.

In January 2014, Dutch newspaper Trouw reported that ABP acknowledged continuing their investment in Israeli banks Bank Hapoalim, Bank Leumi, and Bank Mizrahi-Tefahot, each of which fund Israeli settlement construction in the occupied Palestinian territories.

In January 2025, it was announced that ABP was removing Tesla from the fund, triggered by the planned salary package for Elon Musk, which the fund voted against.

=== US investment activities ===
In the United States, as in Europe, ABP is a major investor in financial markets including public equity, fixed income, real estate, commodities, hedge funds and private equity.

According to information published by ABP, its largest US investments include ExxonMobil, JPMorgan Chase, General Electric, Goldman Sachs, Morgan Stanley, Citigroup, Boston Properties, Public Storage, Microsoft and Cisco Systems. For various reasons, ABP divested from construction machine manufacturer Caterpillar and controversial AI software company Palantir.

=== Hedge fund investments ===
Based in New York City, New Holland Capital (NHC) is a 38-person alternative investment manager that oversees $20 billion in absolute return investments strategies for institutional clients.

Founded in 2003 by Ira Handler, the firm began as the exclusive, non-discretionary advisors to APG Investments. In 2020, NHC expanded to a multi-client model and is now led by Chief Executive Officer Scott Radke and Chief Investment Officer Michael Jacobellis.

=== Private equity investments ===
AlpInvest Partners, founded in 1999 is the exclusive manager of private equity investments for APG and fellow Dutch pension group Stichting Pensioenfonds Zorg en Welzijn. AlpInvest is one of the largest private equity investment managers globally with over €40 billion (approximately $50 billion) under management at the end of 2007. AlpInvest has offices in Amsterdam, New York City, Hong Kong and London with over 60 investment professionals and over 100 employees. AlpInvest pursues investment opportunities across the entire spectrum of private equity: buyout, venture capital, growth capital, mezzanine and distressed. AlpInvest also invests across the range of private equity investment channels:

- Equity co-investments
- Mezzanine investments
- Primary fund investments
- Secondary investments

== Criticism ==
In June 2018, ABP was criticized by environmental organizations for its investments in tar sands oil companies and pipelines. ABP reacted by stating that active engagement with the companies delivers more result than divestment from these companies.

ABP is also criticized for investing in Israeli banks that fund Israeli settlement construction in the occupied Palestinian territories, which considered illegal under international law.

== See also ==
- AlpInvest Partners
- APG
