= SVG Capital =

British private equity business

- Company type: Public (LSE: SVI)
- Industry: Private Equity; Investment Management
- Founded: 1996
- Defunct: 2017
- Headquarters: London, United Kingdom
- Key people: Andrew Sykes, Chairman; Lynn Fordham, CEO Non-Executive Directors – Simon Bax, Stephen Duckett, Helen Mahy David Robins, Senior Independent Director
- Revenue: £4.6 million (2016)
- Operating income: £(12.5) million (2016)
- Net income: £(16.1) million (2016)
- Website: www.svgcapital.com (archived)

SVG Capital (LSE: SVI) was a leading British private equity and investment management business. Headquartered in London, it was listed on the London Stock Exchange.

== History ==
The business was established in 1996 to acquire the private equity interests of Schroder Venture Group ('SVG'). It was first listed on the London Stock Exchange in the same year.

In May 2008, SVG Capital announced the sale of £102 million of limited partnership interests in six private equity funds to Lexington Partners and SVG's collateralized fund obligation vehicle, SVG Diamond.

In October 2012, SVG Capital suffered a temporary downfall with its Hugo Boss shares taking a tumble of 12%.

In February 2013, SVG Capital sold 50.1% of SVG Advisers to Aberdeen Asset Management for £17.5 million. In August 2013, SVG Capital sold SVG Investment Managers to the Swiss investment company Hansa AG, without revealing the details of the deal.

In September 2016, trying to avert the hostile take-over by HarbourVest Partners, SVG Capital, holding out for a more advantageous offer, rejected an offer from Pomona Capital and Pantheon Ventures for half of its portfolio in favor of an offer by Goldman Sachs Alternatives and Canada Pension Plan. In October 2016, having received a more favorable offer from them, the company agreed to sell its portfolio to HarbourVest for £807 million.

In April 2015, SVG Capital's stake in the joint venture vehicle Aberdeen SVG Private Equity Managers, was acquired by their joint venture partner Aberdeen Asset Management for the sum of £29m.

In April 2017, the company announced that it would appoint a liquidator to manage the final distribution to shareholders. It was announced that SVG Capital would wind up on 29 June 2017 subject to a vote.

== Investments ==
SVG Private Equity utilised collateralised fund obligation securitizations as part of its "Diamond" program, SVG Diamond (2004), SVG Diamond II (2006) and SVG Diamond III (2007) in order to raise capital for its private equity investments.

SVG Private Equity had significant investments in private equity funds managed by Permira, which comprised over half of the firm's portfolio by value.
