= StepStone Group =

American global private markets firm

StepStone Group LP

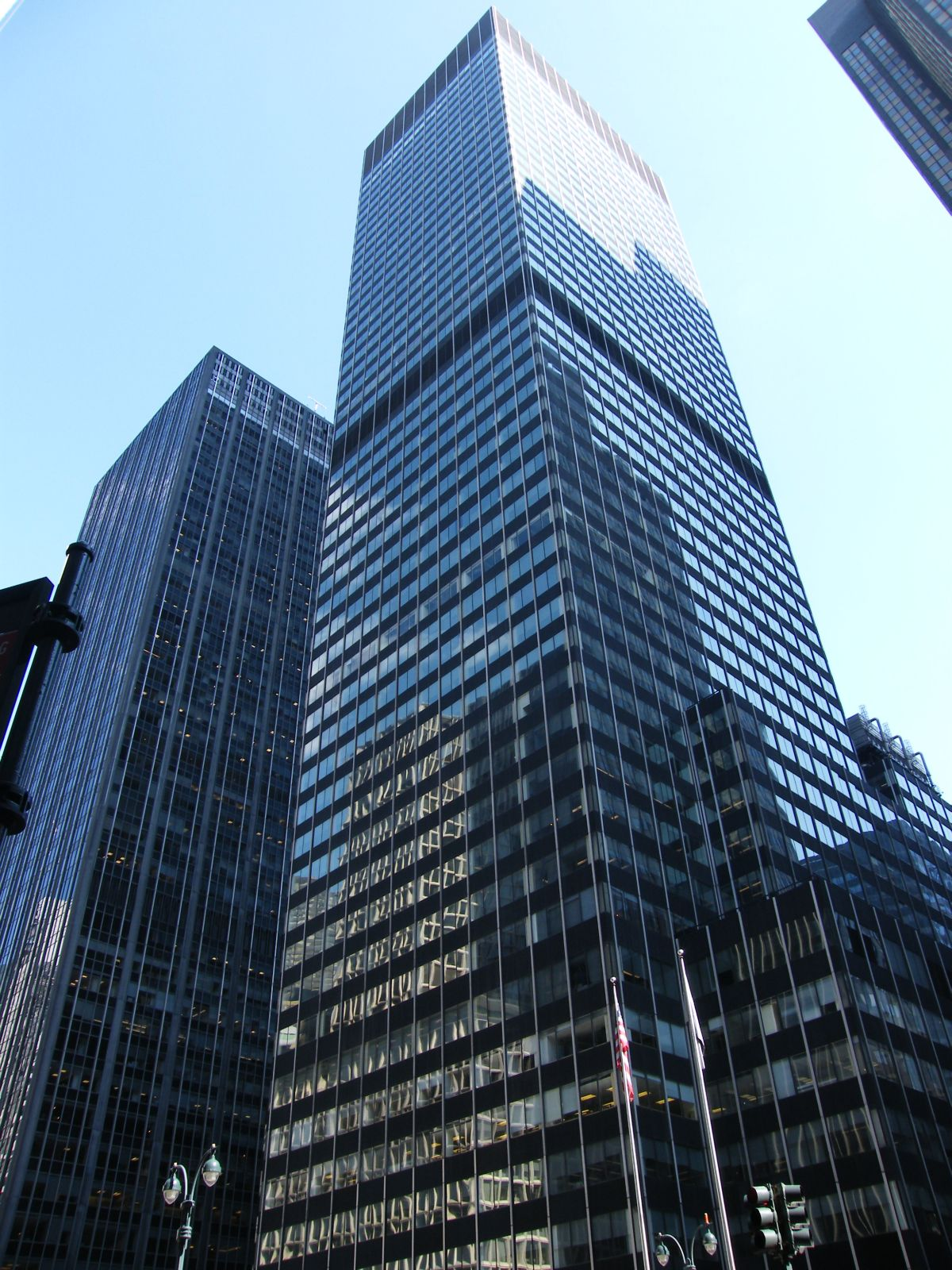
- Headquarters at 277 Park Avenue
- Type: Public
- Traded as: Nasdaq: STEP; S&P 600 component
- Industry: Financial services
- Founded: 2006; 20 years ago
- Headquarters: 277 Park Avenue, New York City, U.S.
- Number of locations: 25 offices
- AUM: $233 billion (2026)
- Number of employees: 1,300+ (2026)
- Website: stepstonegroup.com

StepStone Group LP is a global private markets firm providing customized investment, portfolio monitoring and advice to investors. StepStone covers primary fund investments, secondary fund investments and co-investments across private equity, real estate, infrastructure and real assets, and private debt.

== History ==
StepStone was founded in 2006 and is based in New York, New York. The founders, Monte Brem and Thomas Keck had previously made private equity investments for Pacific Corporate Group, as President and Managing Director, respectively. From its first office in La Jolla, the firm has expanded to New York City, San Francisco, Cleveland, Toronto, Dublin, London, Luxembourg, Zurich, Beijing, Hong Kong, Seoul, Tokyo, Sao Paulo, Sydney, and Perth. The firm oversees over US$130 billion of private capital allocations, including over US$34 billion of assets under management.

In March 2015, it was published that StepStone would move its Manhattan headquarters to the former offices of Bernard L. Madoff Investment Securities, and the site of where company head Bernard Madoff operated his $65 billion Ponzi scheme.

In 2012, StepStone appointed Mushin Kim as a partner in the Asian region and expanded its Korean office, and began to expand its investment in Asia in earnest.

On September 16, 2020, StepStone held its initial public offering on the Nasdaq.

In June 2022, the company made an investment in Multiverse as part of a $220 million investment round.

=== Investments ===
StepStone typically invests between $15 million and $200 million in firms with enterprise value between $150 million and $2.5 billion.
