= Crossroads Group =

Defunct private equity firm

The Crossroads Group
- Type: Private
- Industry: Private equity, venture capital
- Founded: 1981; 45 years ago
- Defunct: October 2003
- Fate: Acquired by Lehman Brothers
- Successor: Neuberger Berman (2009); Lehman Brothers Private Equity (2003)
- Headquarters: Dallas, Texas, United States
- Products: Fund of funds, Secondaries, Co-investments

The Crossroads Group was a Dallas-based private equity fund of funds firm focusing on venture capital investments. The firm, founded in 1981 by Brad Heppner, was acquired by Lehman Brothers in October 2003. Since Lehman Brothers' 2008 bankruptcy, Crossroads has been a part of Neuberger Berman.

== History ==
Founded in 1981 as Bigler/Crossroads, the firm focused on investing as a limited partner in venture capital funds and, to a lesser extent, other private equity strategies including middle market U.S. leveraged buyout investments and mezzanine capital. Crossroads was also an early investor in secondary interests in existing private equity partnerships.

At the time of its acquisition in 2003, Crossroads managed approximately $2 billion of capital on behalf of its investors. Over its 22-year history, the firm raised 16 Crossroads Funds, and invested with more than 200 private equity firms.

In 1999, Crossroads acquired a $340 million portfolio of direct investments in large to mid-cap companies from Electronic Data Systems (EDS).
