= HarbourVest Partners =

American private equity fund of funds

HarbourVest Partners, LLC

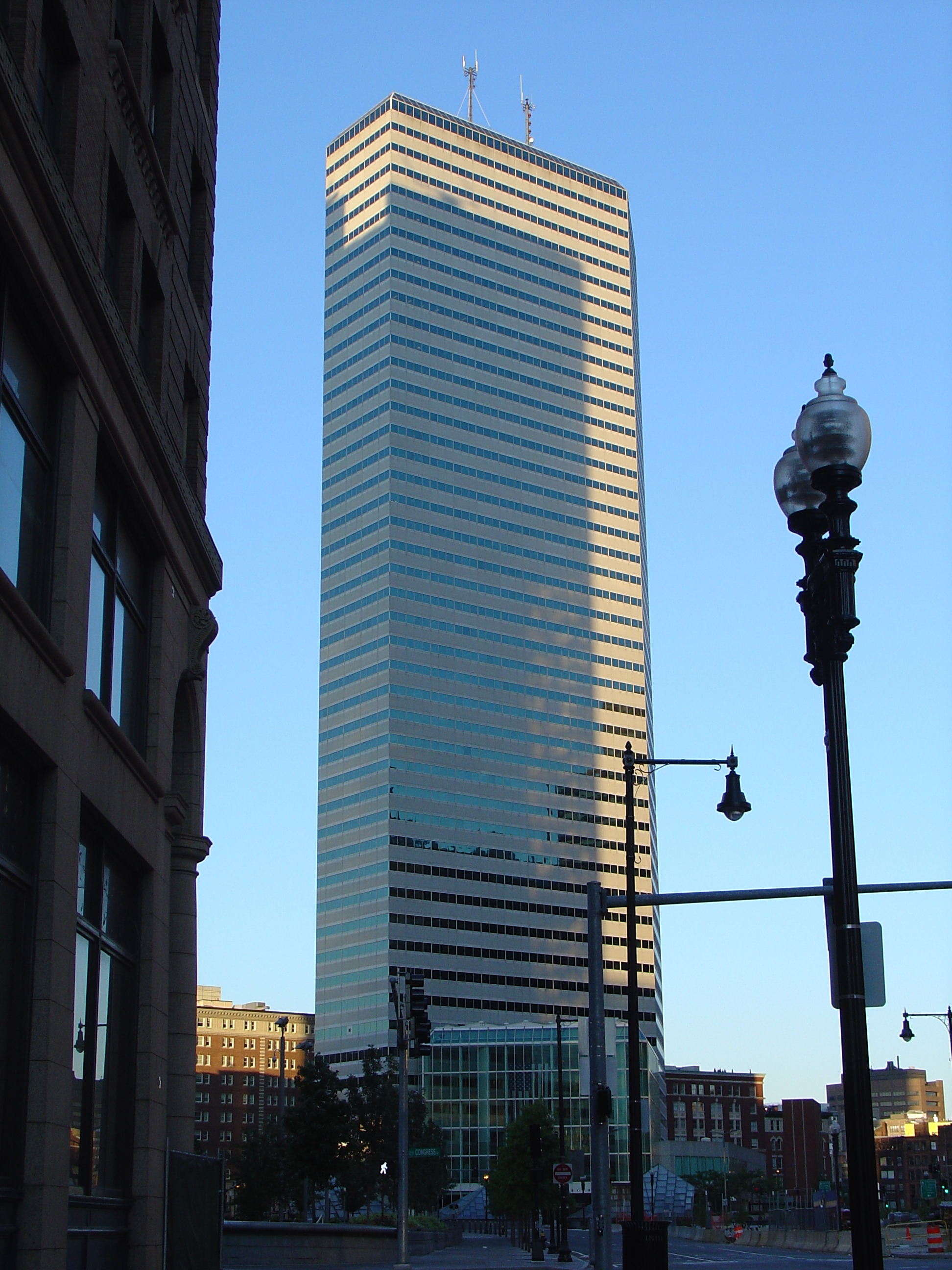
- Headquarters at One Financial Center
- Type: Private
- Industry: Private Equity
- Predecessor: Hancock Venture Partners
- Founded: 1982; 44 years ago
- Headquarters: One Financial Center; Boston, Massachusetts, United States
- Products: Fund of funds, Secondaries, Equity co-investment, Mezzanine capital
- Total assets: $161 billion (2025)
- Number of employees: 1300+ (2026)
- Website: www.harbourvest.com

HarbourVest Partners, LLC is a private equity fund of funds and one of the largest private equity investment managers globally. The firm invests in all types of private equity funds, including venture capital and leveraged buyout funds, and also directly in operating companies.

Founded in 1982 as Hancock Venture Partners, a subsidiary of John Hancock Insurance, HarbourVest is based in Boston, Massachusetts with offices in Beijing, Bogota, Seoul, Tel Aviv, Tokyo, Toronto, London, Singapore and Hong Kong. HarbourVest has approximately 230 investment professionals globally and manages approximately $161 billion of investor commitments.

Investors in HarbourVest funds include various types of institutional investors such as public and corporate pension funds, endowments, foundations and financial institutions.

In June 2024, HarbourVest Partners ranked 47th in Private Equity International's PEI 300 ranking among the world's largest private equity firms.

== Investments ==
According to the companies SEC 13F-HR filing in August 2017, the companies investments included:

- Lending Club
- Acceleron Pharma
- Box Inc.
- Tesla
- Groupon
- Silver Spring Networks
- Zendesk
- Trevena
- Wayfair

== Secondary transactions ==
HarbourVest has completed a number of significant secondary market investments in private equity:

- 2008 - Macquarie Capital Alliance, in June 2008, announced a takeover offer from a consortium of private equity secondary firms including AlpInvest Partners, HarbourVest Partners, Pantheon Ventures, Partners Group, Paul Capital Partners, Portfolio Advisors and Procific (a subsidiary of the Abu Dhabi Investment Authority) in one of the first public to private transactions of a publicly traded private equity company completed by secondary market investors.
- 2007 - California Public Employees' Retirement System (CalPERS) agrees to the sale of $2.1 billion portfolio of legacy private equity funds at the end of 2007, after a process that had lasted more than a year. The buying group included Oak Hill Investment Management, Conversus Capital, Lexington Partners, HarbourVest, Coller Capital and Pantheon Ventures.
- 2006 - American Capital Strategies sells a $1 billion portfolio of investments to a consortium of secondary buyers including HarbourVest Partners, Lexington Partners and Partners Group
- 2003 - HarbourVest acquired a $1.3 billion of private equity fund interests in over 50 funds from UBS AG through a joint venture transaction

== See also ==
- Equity co-investment
- Fund of funds
- HarbourVest Global Private Equity
- Limited partner
