= Multi-manager investment =

Investment product

A multi-manager fund is an investment product that consists of multiple specialized funds. Each specialized fund may invest across different sectors and markets, or in the same asset class but have different investment styles. For example, large cap value fund versus large cap growth fund.

Multi-manager funds are often custom tailored products offered by an asset manager, mostly by the asset or wealth management division of a large investment bank or private bank. They can consists of funds from outside asset managers, like a hedge fund, but mostly consist solely from funds managed by the multi-manager fund marketer itself.

They differ from funds-of-funds in that they do not raise capital from multiple investors as they are custom tailored. But the term Multi-manager fund is often also associated with funds where assets are commingled from multiple investors when multi-manager funds are marketed and thus can represent a fund-of-funds.

Independent or more specialized asset managers like hedge fund firms or private equity firms may offer so-called separate managed accounts to a single investor who commits a large amount of capital and pursues a manager of managers approach. Such a private investment vehicles is not a fund, is not marketed and is not a multi-manager investment product. On the other hand, multi-manager funds are offered with much less capital need to invest. Multi-manager funds are therefore often part of the whole service catalog of a wealth management division of an investment bank or private bank.

The theory of multi-manager funds is founded on the premise that not all investment managers are good in all markets and that not all managers are successful at all times. Spreading the investment money across different asset classes or markets allows the investor to achieve the necessary diversification, reducing risk without sacrificing the return. However, as the main marketers and providers are large investment banks or private banks, sales staff or private client advisors may are subject to conflicts of interest as they are selling an investment product consisting of funds from their employer where bonuses are paid on the basis of underlying fund fee revenue and invested capital into the multi-manager fund. In addition, the multi-manager fund itself charges also fees.

== See also ==
- Investment management
