= MidOcean Partners =

American private equity firm

- Type: Private
- Industry: Private Equity
- Founded: February 2003; 23 years ago
- Founder: Ted Virtue
- Headquarters: Midtown Manhattan, New York City
- Area served: Global
- Products: Private equity funds, Leveraged buyouts
- Total assets: Over $12 billion
- Website: www.midoceanpartners.com

MidOcean Partners, based in Midtown Manhattan, New York City, is an alternative asset management firm that specializes in mid-sized private equity and alternative leveraged investments.

== History ==
MidOcean Partners was formed in February 2003 when the managers of DB Capital Partners acquired Deutsche Bank's late stage private equity investments in the United States and Europe for €1.5 billion in one of the largest private equity secondary market transactions completed to date. Among the investors in the transaction were NIB Capital Private Equity (now AlpInvest Partners), HarbourVest Partners, Paul Capital Partners, Coller Capital, Ontario Teachers' Pension Plan and CPP Investment Board, Northwestern Mutual, The Yucaipa Companies and Presidential Life. By 2004, the portfolio was worth $3 billion, of which $1.6 billion was liquidated. MidOcean also took over management of the liquidation of a €1 billion portfolio from a fund sponsored by Deutsche Bank. In 2002, MidOcean acquired Jenny Craig, Inc.; it was sold in 2006 for $600 million, or 5 times the purchase price. In 2003, MidOcean sold Jostens, a supplier of class rings and school yearbooks, to CSFB for nearly $500 million.

In January 2007, MidOcean acquired Sbarro for $450 million. In 2013, MidOcean acquired Water Pik; it was sold in 2017.

=== 2010s ===
In May 2016, MidOcean acquired Travelpro International and Holiday Group, a supplier of luggage, assorted bags, and travel accessories sold predominantly in the United States and Canada. In September 2018, MidOcean Partners acquired Questex for an estimated $180 million.

In December 2018, MidOcean acquired HW Holdco and Meyers Research, part of Zonda Home.

=== 2020s ===
In May 2021, MidOcean sold its majority stake in The Planet Group, acquired in 2018, to ProPharma Group, making 8.5 times its investment. Later that year, in November 2021, Hunter Point Capital acquired a minority stake in MidOcean.

In June 2022, MidOcean Partners acquired Pragmatic Institute, a product management training company.

In November 2024, MidOcean acquired Arnott Industries, a designer, developer, manufacturer and distributor of air suspension systems and suspension components for the automotive aftermarket.

In April 2025, MidOcean acquired a majority stake in GSTV, a national video platform at fuel retailers.
