= Lexington Partners =

Private equity company

- Type: Subsidiary
- Industry: Private equity
- Founded: 1994; 32 years ago
- Headquarters: 399 Park Avenue; New York , NY 10022; U.S.
- Products: Secondary Investments, Equity co-investments, Fund Investments
- AUM: $55 billion
- Parent: Franklin Templeton
- Website: www.lexingtonpartners.com

Lexington Partners is an American company founded in 1994, and one of the largest managers of secondary acquisition and co-Investment funds in the world.

Lexington Partners manages approximately $55 billion in assets. In 2020, the company raised an unprecedented $14 billion ninth fund (Lexington Capital Partners IX, closed in January 2020), the largest dedicated secondaries pool of capital ever raised at the time.

Lexington Partners is headquartered in New York with offices in Boston, Menlo Park, London, Hong Kong, Santiago, São Paulo and Luxembourg. They are a subsidiary of Franklin Templeton.

== History ==
Lexington Partners was founded by Brent R. Nicklas. Formerly a founding member of Landmark Partners, Nicklas helped pioneer the formation of the secondary market and was involved in some of the earliest secondary deals dating back to 1993.

On November 1, 2021, Franklin Templeton announced they would acquire 100.0% of Lexington Partners in a $1.75 billion cash deal. This acquisition was finalized on April 5, 2022.

== Investment program ==
Lexington invests much like a fund of funds, purchasing interests in various investment funds, typically structured as limited partnerships. Lexington Partners acquires positions in venture capital, leveraged buyout and mezzanine capital funds, together with portfolios of companies or stakes in companies from institutions, corporations, government bodies and family offices.

Lexington is a dedicated secondaries investor and like many of its peers has limited ability to make new commitments to private equity funds. While in certain instances this impacts the firm's desirability to general partners as a replacement limited partner, Lexington does make strategic commitments to newly formed private equity funds. The firm also manages equity co-investment vehicles that invest alongside global private equity sponsors. Lexington's secondary funds have committed to over 500 newly formed private equity funds while Lexington's co-investment funds have committed to invest over $7.0 billion in over 400 co-investments in the U.S., Europe and Asia.

Lexington's limited partners include public and corporate pension funds, sovereign wealth funds, insurance companies, financial institutions, endowments, foundations, and family offices from over 40 countries.

== Notable transactions ==
Since 1994, Lexington has stated that it has completed over 500 secondary market transactions. Although most secondary transactions are private, the following are notable publicly disclosed transactions and firm milestones:

- 2022 – Franklin Templeton finalizes the acquisition of Lexington Partners for $1.75Bn in a 100.0% all cash transaction.
- 2021 – Lexington Partners begins marketing and raising Lexington Partners X and its associated vehicles, targeting a $15.0BN fundraising target
- 2020 – Lexington Partners raised a record $14 billion for Lexington Partners IX and its associated vehicles
- 2018 – Lexington Partners leads a $1.2 billion Warburg Pincus Asia secondary deal.
- 2017 – Lexington Partners sealed a $1 billion secondary deal with London-based BC Partners.
- 2017 – Lexington picks up VC portfolio stake from German broadcaster ProSiebensat.
- 2016 – Lexington Partners opened an office in Santiago, Chile. The new office will serve as Lexington's regional hub in Latin America and it is the sixth location for the firm.
- 2015 – Together with Lothian Pension Fund, Lexington Partners purchased a stake in a tail-end Macquarie fund from the Royal Ordnance (Crown Service) Pension Scheme Trustees.
- 2015 – Lexington Partners beat its targeted $8 billion, closing its eighth private equity secondary fund at its $10.1 billion hard cap. LCP VIII is the biggest secondaries fund ever raised.
- 2014 – J.P. Morgan to Sell Roughly Half Its Stake in One Equity Partners
- 2013 – Lexington Partners closed Lexington Co-Investment Partners III LP which drew over $1.5 billion in capital. This led to an expansion of Lexington's co-investment program to around $4 billion in total capital.
- 2011 – Lexington Partners raised $7 billion for its seventh global secondary fund (LCP VII).
- 2010 – Citi Unloaded $900 Million Private Equity Portfolio.
- 2008 – CalPERS agreed to the sale of a portfolio of legacy private equity funds, having started marketing it in late 2007. A buyer group comprising Oak Hill Investment Management, Conversus Capital, Lexington Partners, HarbourVest, and Pantheon Ventures paid as much as $1.5 billion for the portfolio.
- 2007 – Lexington Partners lead a secondary spin-out transaction from a hedge fund, a $200 million transaction to acquire 70% stake in 19 investments.
- 2006 – American Capital Strategies sold a $1 billion portfolio of investments to a consortium of secondary buyers including Lexington Partners, HarbourVest Partners and Partners Group.
- 2005 – Lexington Partners and AlpInvest Partners acquired a portfolio of private equity fund interests from Dayton Power & Light, an Ohio-based electric utility.
- 2004 – Lexington Partners formed a dedicated secondary fund to acquire private equity interests that were less than 50% funded.
- 2003 – Lexington closed on $2 billion for its fifth fund after two years of marketing.
- 2000 – Lexington Partners and Hamilton Lane acquired $500 million portfolio of private equity funds interests from Chase Capital Partners.
- 2000 – Coller Capital and Lexington Partners completed the purchase of over 250 direct equity investments valued at nearly $1 billion from NatWest.
- 1998 – Lexington Partners established CIP I, one of the first independent, discretionary co-investment programs with a leading U.S.-based institutional investor.
- 1994 – Lexington Partners purchased a portfolio of mezzanine fund interests from a bank, one of the first transactions of its type.
