= Navatar Group =

Navatar Group provides cloud computing and software as a service (SaaS) products to financial firms globally. It offers its financial products to clients in more than 30 countries around the world. The company was founded in 2004 and has its headquarters on Wall Street in New York City in the United States along with an office in New Delhi, India. Alok Misra and Ketan Khandkar are the founders of Navatar Group and serve as the company's Principals.

== History ==
Alok Misra and Ketan Khandkar, former employees of Deloitte Consulting, founded Navatar Group in 2004 after noticing a need for the developing new cloud services sector. Early in the company's history, the founders had made Navatar Group partners with Salesforce.com, a leader in customer relationship management (CRM) that also offers global enterprise software.

Navatar Group's initial purpose was to provide CRM services to the small-to-medium business market, and it was the first to offer cloud products for capital markets and private equity on Wall Street.

Navatar Group began to shift gears as larger financial firms such as M&T Bank and PNC Bank began to take notice of what it had to offer and began requesting off-the-shelf products in place of relying on internal Information Technology (IT) departments.

In order to contain costs, the company made the decision to set up sales, management, and support teams for its products in its New Delhi, India, office as the company expanded.

Navatar Group's customer base now amounts to over 400 clients in more than 30 countries worldwide.

== Products ==
Navatar Group offers cloud products for capital markets, private equity, hedge funds, fund of funds, mutual funds, mergers and acquisitions, investment banking, real estate funds and corporate development. Navatar also operates a deal sourcing marketplace for investment bankers and private equity firms worldwide, called Navatar Deal Connect.
