= Lynn Fordham =

- Born: Lynn Fordham; April 1963 (age 63)
- Education: Glasgow University; Warwick University
- Occupations: CEO, SVG Capital

Lynn Fordham (born April 1963) is a British businesswoman and former CEO of SVG Capital, a defunct FTSE 250 Index private equity and investment management business.

== Early life ==
Lynn Fordham was born in April 1963. She received a bachelor's degree in Accountancy from Glasgow University and a Diploma of Business Administration from Warwick University.

== Career ==
Fordham trained as an accountant at Peat Marwick, Mitchell & Co.

Fordham joined SVG Capital from Barratt Developments in July 2008, and was appointed CEO on 20 May 2009, a role she held until 2016. In 2017, Fordham, together with other former SVG executives, launched private equity firm Larchpoint Capital, based in London.
