= Stichting Pensioenfonds Zorg en Welzijn =

Dutch pension fund for health and welfare care sector

- Company type: Private foundation
- Industry: Pension fund
- Predecessor: PGGM (Pensioenfonds voor de Gezondheid, Geestelijke en Maatschappelijke belangen)
- Founded: 1969; 57 years ago
- Headquarters: Zeist, Netherlands
- Area served: Netherlands
- Key people: Joanne Kellermann (Chairperson)
- Products: Pensions
- Total assets: €253.901 billion (2020)
- Subsidiaries: One Rail Australia (51%); AlpInvest Partners
- Website: www.pfzw.nl

Stichting Pensioenfonds Zorg en Welzijn (PFZW), (lit. 'Pension Fund for Care and Well-Being') is a Dutch pension fund for health care and welfare sector. It is the second largest pension fund in the Netherlands. PFZW uses the PGGM brand to market its asset management services.

As of 2014, PFZW had total assets under management of €161.7 billion ($183 billion, 1EUR=1.13USD) and around $682.6 million revenue.

== History ==
PFZW's predecessor, PGGM, was founded in June 1969 through the merger of several smaller Dutch pension funds in the healthcare industry. In 1970, PGGM assumed responsibility for the pensions of employees throughout the health care and social work sectors in the Netherlands. In 1972, PGGM moved to its current headquarters in Zeist, Netherlands.

PFZW is as a non-profit foundation, controlled by trade unions and employers from the healthcare and social work sectors. At the end of 2006, the governing board of what was then known as PGGM adopted a separation between its policy (structuring of pensions) and implementation (managing of assets and payment) functions. The pension fund (the foundation) continues to formulate pension policy, but was renamed Stichting Pensioenfonds Zorg en Welzijn (PFZW), and a newly created cooperative PGGM managed the fund’s €161.7 billion of assets under management. This separation, which took effect in January 2008 and was taken in response to new legislation passed in the Netherlands that would limit PGGM’s ability to offer related financial services.

== Scope of the fund ==
At the end of 2009, PFZW had 22,000 affiliated employers (employees are enrolled automatically), more than 1.9 million participants. The fund has an investment portfolio of over €110.7 billion and total annualized return (IRR) of 8.0% since 1970 (2007: 9.3%).

Based on assets, PFZW is the second largest pension fund in the Netherlands, behind Stichting Pensioenfonds ABP. More broadly, PFZW stands in the top 5 of European pension funds and in the top 15 globally, based on both number of plan participants and assets under management.

== Investments ==
PGGM manages the bulk of its investments in-house on behalf of PFZW. In 2006, PGGM and Stichting Pensioenfonds ABP, another large Dutch pension fund, considered a spin-off of their asset management businesses. The two pension funds coordinate their activities in private equity through AlpInvest Partners, one of the largest investors globally in the private equity asset class. In the United States, as in Europe, PGGM is a major investor in financial markets including public equity, fixed income, real estate, commodities, hedge funds and private equity.

In January 2015, a unit of Legal & General collaborated with PGGM acquired the Bishopsgate Long-term Property Fund Unit Trust for a fee of £370 million.

=== China ===
In 2008, PGGM announced that it would divest itself of its holding in the NYSE-listed Chinese operator PetroChina (PTR). PGGM announced that it was making the decision because the Chinese operator is involved in human rights violations in the Darfur region of Sudan.

=== Russia ===
In response to the 2022 Russian invasion of Ukraine, PFZW announced its decision to liquidate a portfolio of Russian investments that had been worth 1.2 billion euros ($1.31 billion) as of mid-February.

== See also ==
- AlpInvest Partners - manages PFZW's private equity investment activities
