= Pacific Corporate Group =

Global alternative investment management and advisory company

- Company type: Private
- Industry: Financial services
- Founded: 1979; 47 years ago
- Founder: Christopher Bower
- Headquarters: La Jolla, California, United States
- Products: Asset Management, Private Equity
- Total assets: $17 billion (2009)
- Website: www.pcgfunds.com

Pacific Corporate Group is an American alternative investment management and advisory company headquartered in La Jolla, California.

As of 2009, PCG together with affiliates and subsidiaries managed over $17 billion in assets and has invested and advised upon over $44 billion since 1990. PCG and its affiliates operate through offices based out of La Jolla, New York City, Danvers, Massachusetts, Washington D.C., Singapore and Hong Kong

== History ==
PCG was founded in 1979 by Christopher Bower to focus on building an institution that could produce customizable private equity products to better serve institutional investors. Since then, PCG has served as advisor to some of the largest institutional investors in the world.

PCG registered with the SEC in 1984 as an investment advisor.

PCG's investment performance has been independently verified by Deloitte & Touche since 1989.

PCG introduced the "No-Fault Divorce Clause" provision. These provisions started coming in during the late 1990s, and have now become an industry standard, with almost all funds now having a no-fault divorce clause included.

In 2007, PCG reorganized into three specialized operating affiliates:

- PCG Asset Management, LLC (PCG AM)
- PCG Capital Partners, LLC (PCG CP)
- PCG International LLC (PCGI)

== Corporate Structure ==
=== PCG ===
PCG provides institutionalized, independent operational support for the PCG family of companies. PCG includes: Information Technology and Security, Finance, Accounting, Risk Management, Human Resources, Legal and Compliance.

=== PCG Asset Management ===
PCG Asset Management (PCG AM) provides customized services for institutional investors. PCG AM is a research-focused private equity advisor and fund of funds manager. PCG AM also provides strategic portfolio construction and extensive portfolio monitoring and reporting services.

=== PCG Capital Partners ===
PCG Capital Partners (PCG CP) provides financing to managers of growth companies. PCG CP is a direct investment firm that targets minority investments to fund organic growth initiatives, acquisitions, deleveraging and shareholder liquidity.

=== PCG International ===
PCG International (PCGI) focuses on partnership and co-investments. PCGI is an investment management firm focused on select private equity markets outside the US.
