= NAV lending =

NAV Lending: Asset-Based Loans to Private Equity Funds

NAV (Net Asset Value) lending is a form of fund-level financing where loans are secured by the value of a private equity fund's investments rather than the uncalled capital commitments of limited partners (LPs). NAV-based credit facilities provide liquidity to private equity funds by allowing them to borrow against the underlying portfolio. These facilities differ from subscription line financing, which relies on LP commitments rather than the net asset value of the fund's holdings.

NAV-based loans have grown in prominence, particularly in response to market dislocations such as the COVID-19 pandemic, which increased the demand for fund-level liquidity solutions. With the growth of private equity as an asset class, the NAV lending market has expanded significantly, with transaction sizes increasing from millions to upwards of $1 billion in recent years.

== Historical Background on NAV Lending ==
=== Early Market Development ===
The origins of NAV lending can be traced back to the mid-2000s, when private equity managers began seeking new liquidity solutions through the private equity secondary market. In the 2010s, private equity funds began to use subscription-based borrowings, based on the credit quality of the fund's LPs. The use of these facilities accelerated during the course of the decade as managers sought to differentiate their net returns to investors in an increasingly competitive fundraising market after the 2008 financial crisis. By 2022, these subscription-based facilities had reached in excess of 75% penetration among private equity funds.

Meanwhile, a small fraction of private equity funds, without the remaining unfunded commitments needed to support a subscription-based financing, pursued asset-based, NAV financings. NAV lending gained some initial traction during the 2008 financial crisis, when liquidity constraints forced a small group of private equity managers to explore more innovative financing solutions often to support individual portfolio companies. Early versions of these loans, often provided by banks were actually made to an individual portfolio company with a guarantee from the private equity fund. Thereafter, new structures were being offered by a small group of banks and niche lenders. Through most of the 2010s, the vast majority of these NAV financings were small (less than $20 million) and pursued primarily by tail-end funds and managers.

Around 2017, it is estimated that the cumulative annual volume of NAV lending exceeded $1 billion for the first time. Market growth is estimated to have compounded at approximately 100% per annum for each of the next few years with growth accelerating during the COVID-19 recession as many private equity portfolio companies faced financial challenges and managers were seeking alternative forms of leverage.

The market for NAV lending achieved another phase of growth beginning in late 2022 with the tightening monetary policy that was pursued to manage increasing inflation. The 2023 US Regional Banking Crisis severely impacted several large providers of fund-level financing such as Silicon Valley Bank and First Republic Bank, creating an opportunity for the entry and growth of several non-bank private lenders. By 2024, awareness of NAV lending among private markets participants had increased significantly although actual market penetration still remained relatively limited and market development was still in its early stages.

=== Market Guidelines and Continued Growth ===
In 2024, the Institutional Limited Partners Association (ILPA) issued non-binding guidelines regarding the use of NAV-based lending, particularly around transparency and risk management. This was largely in response to criticisms raised by certain financial publications that cited complaints by institutional investors about transparency and the potential impact on LP returns. Many of these articles focused on the idea that by enabling early distributions, NAV loans would create artificial liquidity, which could ultimately dilute long-term investment returns.

ILPA has also highlighted the risk of over-leverage, as NAV loans increase fund-level debt exposure. In periods of financial stress, excessive reliance on NAV lending could amplify losses for investors. Additionally, concerns around valuation and transparency persist, as NAV lending relies on periodic asset valuations that may be subject to discrepancies and potential manipulation.

With equity markets rising in 2024, many of the NAV loans put in place in the preceding years have performed well. Stabilizing private equity valuations and modest liquidity in the market validated certain loans that had drawn criticism in the preceding two years. With ILPA guidelines established, market participants have projected continued growth in NAV lending through the end of the 2020s with projections ranging from $50 billion to as much as $100 billion or more in annual volume. In the latter half of 2023 the use of NAV loans by Private Equity firms specifically to fund cash distributions to LPs fell 90%. This volume was replaced by investors using NAV loans for accretive investments that can be broadly defined as offensive or defensive.

Industry participants distinguish between "offensive" and "defensive" uses of NAV financing. Offensive applications include funding add-on acquisitions for portfolio companies or participating in "pay-to-play" rounds to protect equity stakes from dilution. Defensive applications serve as a liquidity bridge during market dislocations, providing a "runway" to avoid forced asset sales at depressed valuations or supporting portfolio companies facing temporary cash flow shortfalls.

== Types of NAV-Based Financings ==
NAV lending encompasses a range of financing structures tailored to the needs of private equity funds and their LPs.

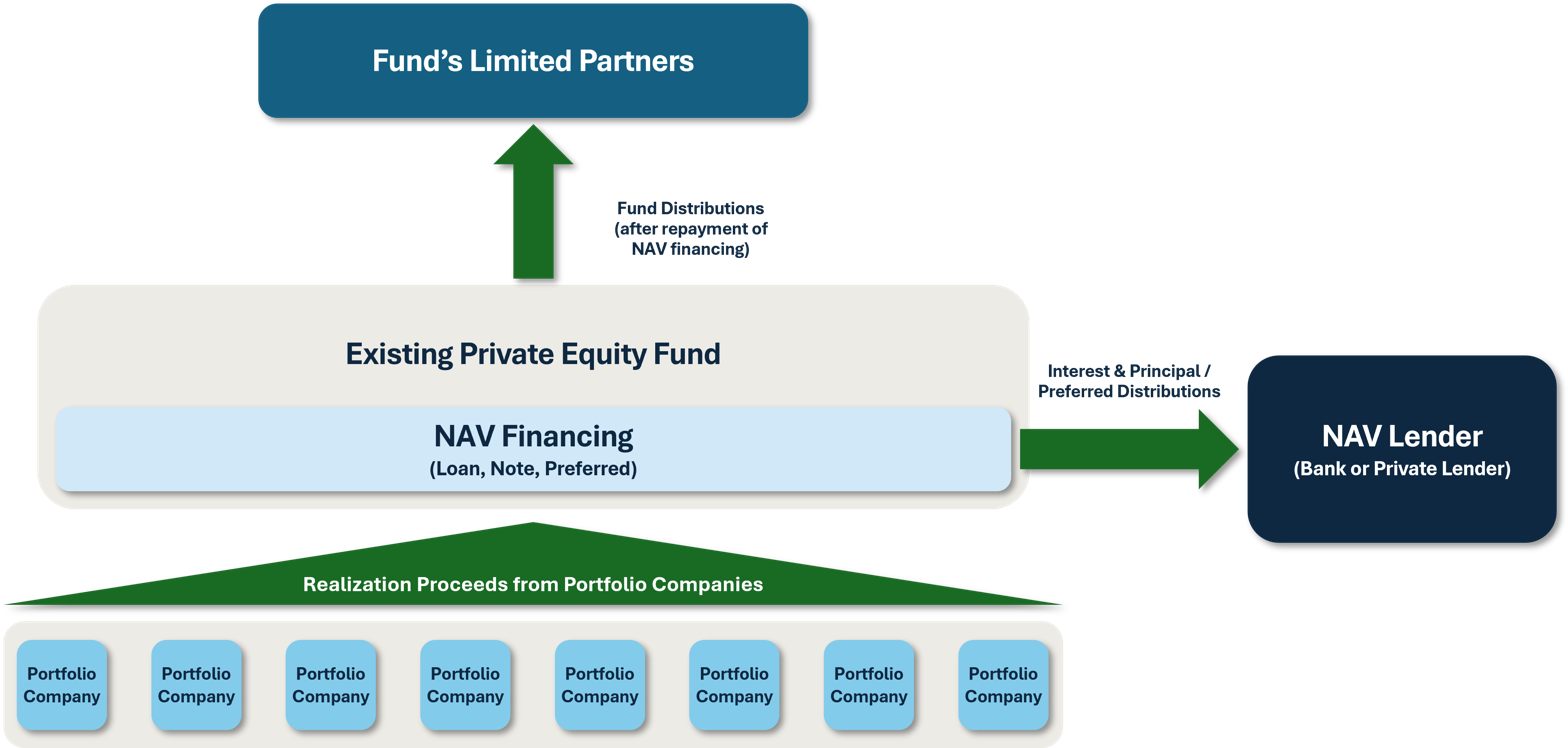
Diagram detailing the financial structure of an NAV loan

One of the most common forms is senior secured lending, which is typically provided by banks but increasingly by insurance companies and asset managers. These loans feature lower loan-to-value (LTV) ratios, generally ranging from 5% to 12%, and have relatively short maturities of around two to four years. Senior secured lending requires direct security over the underlying portfolio assets, ensuring lender protection in case of financial distress.

Unitranche lending is another widely used form of NAV financing. It combines characteristics of senior and subordinated debt to provide borrowers with a more flexible structure. Unitranche loans tend to have higher LTV ratios, ranging from 10% to 20%, and can be tailored to meet the needs of private equity funds with diversified portfolios. These loans often include features such as cash flow sweeps and fixed maturities to manage credit risk effectively although they may utilize a security interest in a holding vehicle rather than security in each individual asset and they may offer certain flexibility such as PIK / toggle interest.

Mezzanine financing is another category of NAV lending, often structured as debt, preferred equity, or senior limited partnership interests. Compared to unitranche lending, mezzanine financing has higher LTV ratios, which can range above from 25% in fund financings, depending on the diversification of the underlying assets. These transactions typically include fixed coupon payments and may incorporate warrants or equity participation rights. In fund financing, this form of financing structure has decreased in favor of lower cost unitranche financing since 2020 although it is often used in other areas of portfolio finance.

Structured equity financing is also an option, albeit rarely used in fund finance. By contrast structured equity has long been a popular option in LP interest financings and more recently in financings for GP management company assets. This form of financing blends debt and equity characteristics, offering a hybrid investment structure that minimizes equity dilution while maintaining flexibility. Structured equity transactions generally feature high LTV ratios of 50% to 75% and are often designed to prioritize cash flow rights for investors.

A hybrid loan refers to a financing facility that combines elements of both a traditional subscription line (based on uncalled capital commitments) and an NAV loan (secured against the net asset value of a fund's portfolio), essentially allowing lenders to access both the fund's uncommitted capital and the value of its underlying investments as collateral, providing greater flexibility for the fund manager throughout the fund's lifecycle. Unlike a pure NAV loan, a hybrid loan allows lenders to draw on both the uncalled capital commitments from investors and the value of the fund's portfolio assets, providing a broader security base. This structure can be particularly beneficial for funds at the end of their investment period when the original capital commitments are largely deployed but the fund may still need access to additional financing. These financings can often achieve lower pricing than pure NAV loans, however like subscription lines they typically are short-term loans and often have onerous borrowing base restrictions.

=== Portfolio Finance and Asset-Based Finance ===
Portfolio Finance is a broader asset class that encompasses NAV lending, along with financing structures for portfolios of LP interests in private equity funds and financing for private equity firm management companies. These financing strategies provide liquidity at different levels of private equity investment structures and cater to distinct financing needs.

NAV lending focuses on providing loans secured by the value of a private equity fund's existing portfolio of assets. In contrast, financing for LP interest portfolios involves lending against a diversified pool of LP positions across multiple funds, which generally reduces risk due to increased diversification. Financing for private equity firm management companies, on the other hand, targets assets such as management fees, carried interest, and equity stakes in the firm's funds, making it a more cash flow-driven form of lending rather than asset-backed.

A key advantage of Portfolio Finance is the use of cross-collateralization, where multiple assets or funds serve as collateral for a single loan facility. This structure enhances credit quality by spreading risk across a broader set of underlying assets, reducing the probability of default due to the underperformance of a single portfolio investment. Cross-collateralization is particularly valuable in NAV lending and LP interest financing, as it allows lenders to mitigate risks associated with market volatility and individual asset underperformance.

Portfolio Finance is a key component of the larger asset-based financing market, which includes other collateralized lending strategies such as real estate-backed loans, infrastructure financing, and corporate asset-based loans. Within this broader market, Portfolio Finance distinguishes itself by focusing on the unique capital needs of private equity funds and investors, enabling enhanced liquidity solutions that complement traditional exit strategies.

Family offices utilize NAV lending to manage liquidity within illiquid private-market portfolios. These facilities allow owners to access capital without resorting to secondary market sales, which often involve significant discounts to fair value. Common features include Payment-in-Kind (PIK) interest structures, which capitalize interest to align with the irregular cash flows of private assets. This capital is frequently used for portfolio rebalancing or meeting capital calls while maintaining long-term equity upside.

=== NAV Lending and Private Equity Secondaries ===
NAV lending is closely linked to the private equity secondaries market, as both financing mechanisms provide liquidity solutions for investors seeking to optimize fund-level capital management. In secondaries transactions, investors buy and sell existing LP interests in private equity funds. NAV lending complements these transactions by enabling sellers to access liquidity through borrowing rather than selling their interests at a discount.

Secondary buyers, such as continuation funds, also utilize NAV-based financing to support acquisitions of fund interests. By leveraging NAV loans, secondary investors can enhance their purchasing power and structure transactions more efficiently. Additionally, private equity sponsors engaging in GP-led secondary transactions often turn to NAV-based credit facilities to provide liquidity for restructuring existing funds while maintaining ownership and control of portfolio assets.

NAV lending has proven particularly useful in structured secondary transactions where investors seek to extend the duration of existing funds rather than liquidate assets. This growing intersection between NAV lending and secondaries is reshaping the private equity market by providing flexible, alternative liquidity solutions to investors and fund managers alike.

== Market Participants ==
NAV lending has attracted a diverse range of market participants, including banks, alternative credit firms, and private equity asset managers.

Large banks such as Goldman Sachs, JPMorgan, Macquarie Group and Sumitomo Mitsui Banking Corporation have historically played a crucial role in providing senior secured NAV loans, particularly for well-established private equity firms. These banks offer lower-cost capital, though their lending structures tend to be more restrictive in terms of covenants and collateral requirements.

In contrast, non-bank lenders such as HPS Investment Partners, Oaktree Capital Management's 17Capital subsidiary, and Ares Management have developed more flexible NAV-based financing solutions tailored to private equity sponsors. These firms typically focus on higher-risk, higher-yield lending opportunities and often provide unitranche and mezzanine NAV financing options. Their ability to structure bespoke financing arrangements has contributed to the rapid growth of NAV lending in private markets.

Asset managers like AlpInvest Partners (a subsidiary of The Carlyle Group) have also become significant players in NAV-based financing, often delivering portfolio-level credit solutions alongside secondaries transactions. These firms play a dual role, both as lenders providing structured liquidity solutions to private equity managers as well as a buyer of assets. Newer asset managers such as Lepercq Group-backed Nodem Capital are focused on specific NAV-based financing niches such as Venture Capital and Family Offices.

Private credit funds, insurance companies, and other institutional investors have also increasingly entered the NAV lending market. Insurance companies, such as MassMutual, in particular, have begun using NAV loans as a way to achieve a modest yield premium relative to other forms of private credit. In certain cases, insurance companies sought to securitize their own private equity exposure in order to reduce the risk-weighted capital required to retain exposure to private equity portfolios, however this practices has largely been eliminated following scrutiny by the insurance regulator, the National Association of Insurance Commissioners. By contrast NAV lending is typically considered to be consistent with the NAIC's rules for securities. mis

The continued expansion of market participants has led to greater competition, more favorable financing terms for borrowers, and an increased variety of NAV lending structures.

== See also ==
- Private equity secondary market
- Private equity
- Private equity fund
- Distribution waterfall
- Private credit
- Asset-based lending
- History of private equity and venture capital
