= HarbourVest Global Private Equity =

Investment fund

- Industry: Investment trust
- Founded: December 2007
- Headquarters: British
- Website: www.hvpe.com

HarbourVest Global Private Equity is an investment fund focused on investing in private equity opportunities. Established in December 2007, the company is a constituent of the FTSE 250 Index. The fund is managed by HarbourVest Partners and its chairman is Ed Warner, OBE.
