= Pantheon International =

British investment trust

- Formerly: Pantheon International Participations plc (1987–2015)
- Type: Public
- Traded as: LSE: PIN; FTSE 250 component
- Founded: 1987; 39 years ago
- Headquarters: Exeter, United Kingdom
- Key people: Tony Morgan (chair)
- Website: www.pantheon-international.com

Pantheon International plc (LSE: PIN) is a British publicly traded private equity investment trust and a constituent of the FTSE 250 Index. Established in 1987, it invests in private equity funds and directly in private companies, and is managed by Pantheon Ventures (UK) LLP.

Its objective is to maximise capital growth over the long term, and it does not currently pay a dividend. Net assets were approximately £2.1 billion at 31 May 2026.

== History ==
The company was incorporated in July 1987 as Pantheon International Participations plc and listed on the London Stock Exchange in September that year, adopting its current name in November 2015. In 2017 it consolidated its ordinary and redeemable shares into a single class. Tony Morgan became chair on 1 January 2026, succeeding John Singer. Since August 2025 the company has used the abbreviation "PIN" in place of the previously used "PIP".
