= Private-equity secondary market =

Financial marketplace

In finance, the Private Equity Secondary Market (also often called Private Equity Secondaries or Secondaries) refers to the buying and selling of pre-existing investor commitments to private equity and other alternative investment funds or the underlying private equity assets (e.g., credit secondaries). Unlike public markets, private-equity interests lack an established trading exchange, making transfers more complex and labor-intensive.

Sellers of private-equity investments sell not only their holdings in a fund but also their remaining unfunded commitments. The private-equity asset class is inherently illiquid and is designed for long-term investment by institutional investors, such as pension funds, sovereign wealth funds, insurance companies, endowments, and family offices for wealthy individuals. The secondary market provides these investors with an avenue for liquidity, enabling them to manage their portfolios dynamically. Global secondary transaction volume reached a record ~US$160 billion in 2024.

Buyers seek to purchase secondary interests in private equity assets for multiple reasons, including shorter investment durations, potential discounts on valuations, and greater visibility into the assets held by the fund. Private equity secondary funds are typically marketed as delivering attractive annualized returns (IRR), with limited j-curve issues, shorter duration and enhanced diversification across multiple metrics relative to other forms of private equity funds. Conversely, sellers engage in secondary transactions to create early liquidity in an otherwise illiquid asset class, which may be attractive to reduce over-allocation to private equity, balance private equity exposure by strategy or vintage, meet regulatory requirements or to achieve other strategic objectives.

As private equity has matured, two main segments of the secondary market have emerged:

- LP Interest Secondaries - In these transactions, buyers acquire limited partnership (LP) interests in private-equity funds. The buyer assumes all rights and obligations of the seller, including future capital calls and distributions. Because of the flexibility of cash flows from private equity fund portfolios, these transactions can utilize highly customized structures.
- GP-Led Secondaries - In these transactions, a private-equity fund's general partner (GP) leads a process to provide liquidity to existing investors by selling assets from an existing fund into a new vehicle. In the case of continuation funds, this can be used to allow a manager to retain high performing assets it might otherwise feel required to realize as part of its portfolio management responsibilities. Alternatively, fund recapitalizations can afford early liquidity to investors in more mature funds. GP-led secondaries have grown significantly since 2012, comprising over one-third of the secondaries market as of 2017, and upwards of 50% in the 2020s.

The private-equity secondary market has evolved into a dynamic and essential component of private equity, offering liquidity solutions to investors. As GP-led transactions grow and institutional participation expands, the secondary market is expected to continue increasing in volume and complexity. For the year ended December 31, 2024, market participants estimate annual secondary market volume of roughly $160 billion.

== Types of Secondary Transactions ==
Secondary transactions can be generally divided into two primary categories:

=== LP Interest Secondaries (Sale of Fund Interests) ===
This is the most common type of secondary transaction, involving the sale of an investors interest in a private-equity fund or a portfolio of multiple fund interests. Transactions may take several forms:

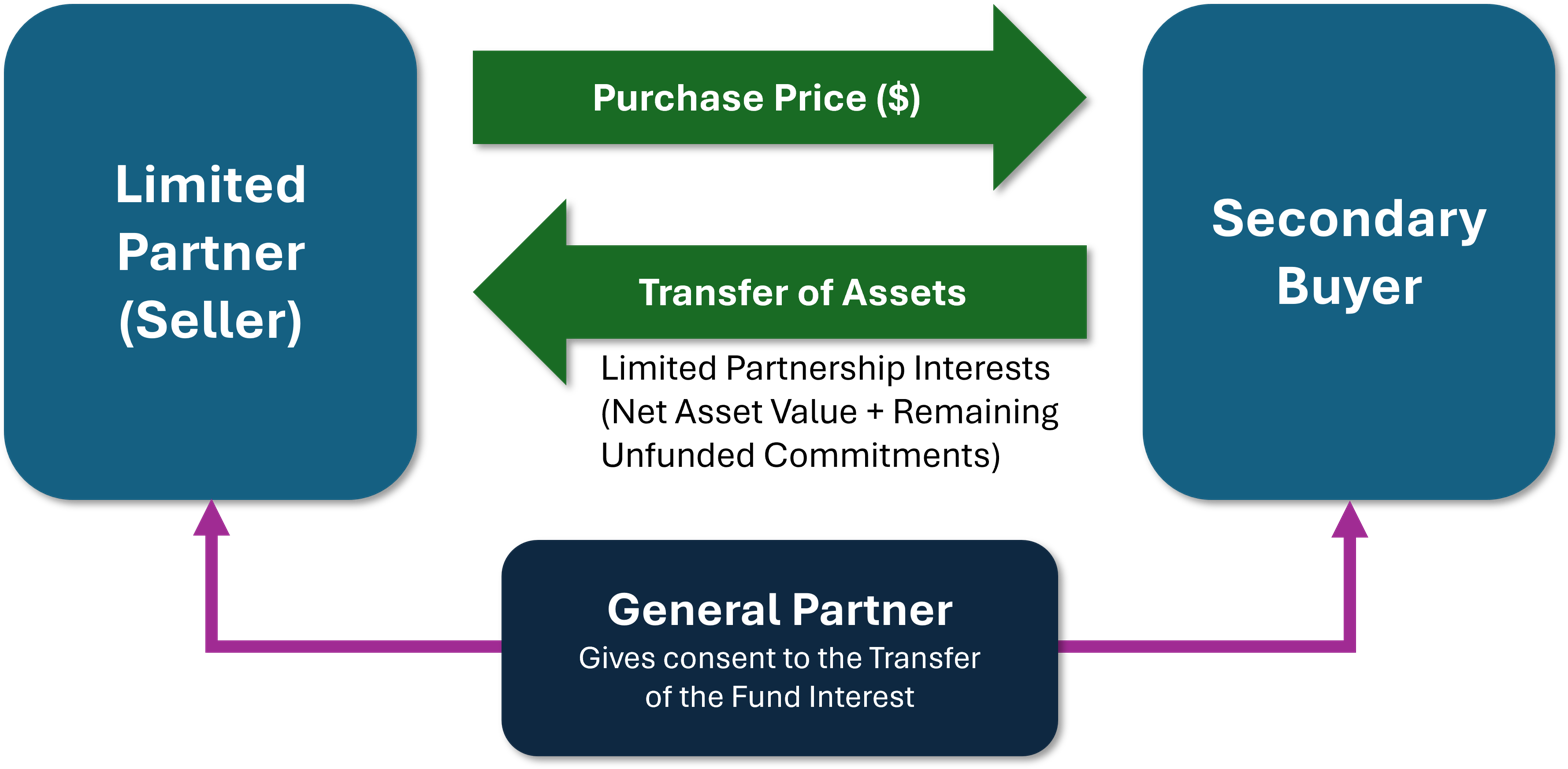
Diagram of a simple secondary market transfer of a limited-partnership fund interest. The buyer exchanges a single cash payment to the seller for both the investments in the fund plus any unfunded commitments to the fund.

- Traditional Secondary Purchase - The most common form of secondary involves the transfer of limited partnership interests in one or more private equity funds from the seller to the buyer. In these transactions, the buyer pays to purchase the interest and assumes any remaining unfunded commitments associated with the interest. The purchase price is typically expressed as a percentage of the net asset value of the fund(s) being purchase.

The purchase price may be paid entirely upfront in cash or through a deferred payment plan. Often, these deferrals will be fully committed by the buyer to be paid over a period of 6 months to 2 years although. The timing of payments is often a highly negotiated part of this transaction.

In order for this transaction to be consummated, the manager of the private equity fund typically must consent to the transfer of the interest and permit the assignment of the interest from the seller to the buyer. Typically the manager is not compensated for this consent although its legal fees are typically reimbursed jointly by the buyer and seller.

- Structured Joint Venture - A customized transaction where buyers and sellers agree on shared ownership structures, often a waterfall of distributions with various sharing percentages between buyer and seller tied to the performance of the underlying portfolio. The portfolio of assets are often transferred to a special purpose vehicle in which both buyer and seller own an interest. Typically, the purchase price, timing of payments as well as the funding of remaining unfunded commitments will be points of negotiation.

Other variants include the Managed Fund in which the seller retains management of the portfolio in order to retain its relationships with the private equity managers in the portfolio and the buyer acquires the economic ownership of the portfolio. This structure, which is most often pursue by financial institutions, such as insurance companies and banks, is typically effectuated with the seller acting as general partner of the managed fund and the buyer acting as the limited partner, albeit with highly enhanced governance.

- Collateralized Fund Obligation (Securitization) - The seller contributes fund interests into a vehicle that issues various classes of rated notes primarily to insurance companies. The seller may retain the junior class of the notes, generating partial liquidity and retaining a highly leveraged position in the portfolio. Alternatively, the seller could sell most or all of the notes in order to create a full liquidity event. After falling out of favor after the 2008 financial crisis, a new form of securitization with significantly enhanced structuring has emerged in the 2020s.
- Early Secondaries or Late Primaries - Involves selling interests in young funds that have called less than one-third of committed capital. In some cases, secondary investors will make a primary commitment to a fund that is already substantially invested (often in excess of 35%) in order to capture an uplift in the valuation in the fund during the fundraising period. In some cases a manager may reopen the fundraising for a fund that had already had a final closing.

=== GP-Led Secondaries ===
Also known as GP-Centered, secondary directs or synthetic secondaries, these transactions involve the sale of a portfolio of direct investments in portfolio companies. Subcategories include:

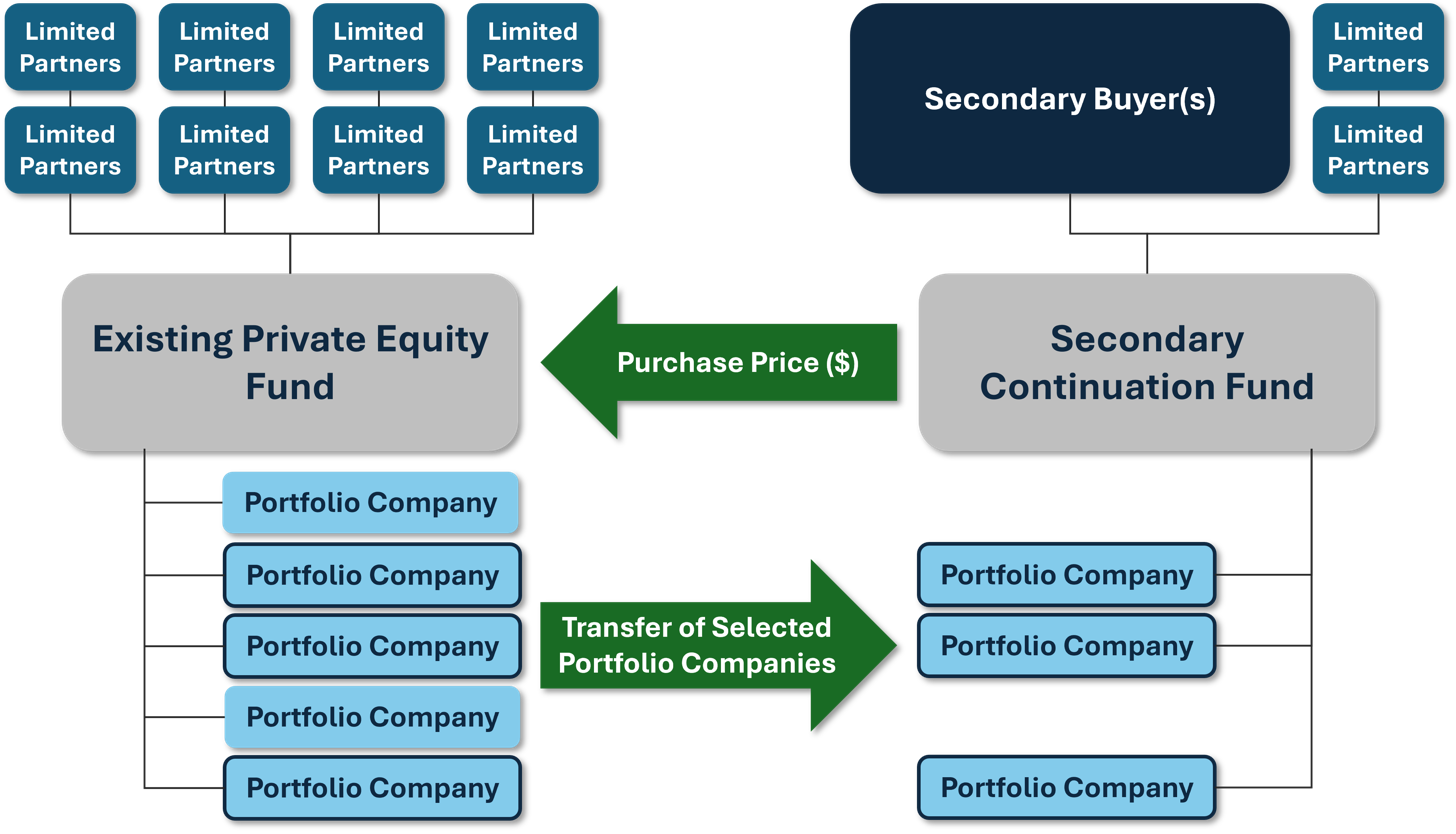
Diagram of a GP-Led secondary market transfer of private equity companies through a Continuation Fund.

- Continuation funds - The most common form of GP-led transaction in which the buyer uses a new private equity fund vehicle (the Continuation Fund) to allow a fund manager to extend the holding of one of its existing portfolio companies (Single-Asset Continuation Fund) or several existing portfolio companies (Multi-Asset Continuation Fund) from one or more existing funds. This allows the manager to maintain control of its best-performing assets while giving existing limited partners the option to receive early liquidity. Existing investors will typically have an option to re-invest their investment into the new Continuation Fund.
- Fund Recapitalization - The buyer uses a new private equity fund vehicle (the Realization Fund) to allow a fund manager to provide liquidity to existing limited partners in a private equity fund purchasing all (or nearly all) of the remaining portfolio companies. Existing investors will typically have an option to rollover their investment into the new Realization Fund.
- Stapled Secondaries - A secondary buyer acquires interests in an existing fund while also committing capital to a new fund being raised by the manager. In certain cases a manager will sponsor a "tender offer" to all of its limited partners, although this practice has waned in the 2020s with the increasing usage of continuation funds. A cornerstone secondary is a transaction in which the manager coordinates a stapled secondary from one or more of its largest existing investors, who may be choosing not to make a new commitment to the manager's successor fund.
- Secondary Directs - The buyer purchases a portfolio of direct private-equity investments from a corporation or institution often through a newly formed private equity fund vehicle typically without an incumbent manager.
- Spinout or Synthetic Secondaries - Investors acquire interests in a newly formed limited partnership holding direct investments often to facilitate the spinout of a captive private equity investment team from a bank, insurance company or asset management platform.

== Secondary-market participants ==
The private-equity secondary market was originally created by Dayton Carr, the founder of Venture Capital Fund of America (VCFA Group), in 1982. Carr had been managing a venture capital investment firm in partnership with Thomas J. Watson Jr. who was then Chairman of IBM Corporation. As their venture fund matured, Carr purchased Watson's partnership interest in 1979 just before Watson became U.S. Ambassador to the Soviet Union (appointed by Jimmy Carter). This was one of the earliest private-equity secondary transactions. Carr shortly thereafter made a strong return on this investment and subsequently shifted his investment focus to purchasing other limited partnership interests in venture capital funds. Through a series of small funds, raised and managed by Dayton Carr, under the VCFA name, the secondary industry was born. VCFA is still in business today and still focuses primarily on secondary private equity investments in venture and growth equity funds. Since its inception through VCFA Group the secondary industry now features dozens of dedicated firms and institutional investors that engage in the purchase and sale of private-equity interests. Some estimates by advisory firm Evercore estimated the size of the overall secondary market for 2013 to be around $26 billion, with approximately $45 billion of "dry powder" (not yet invested capital) available at the end of 2013 and a further $30 billion expected to be raised in 2014. Such large volumes have been fueled by an increasing number of players over the years, which ultimately led to what eventually became a highly competitive and fragmented market. Leading secondary investment firms with current dedicated secondary capital in excess of circa $3 billion include: Blackstone Strategic Partners, AlpInvest Partners, Ardian (formerly AXA Private Equity), Capital Dynamics, Coller Capital, HarbourVest Partners, Lexington Partners, Pantheon Ventures, Partners Group and Neuberger Berman.

Additionally, major investment banking firms including Credit Suisse, Deutsche Bank, Goldman Sachs, JPMorgan Chase, Morgan Stanley have active secondary investment programs. Other institutional investors typically consider investing in secondary interests. More and more primary investors, whether private-equity funds of funds or other institutional investors, also allocate some of their primary program to secondaries.

As the private-equity secondary market matures, non-traditional secondary strategies are emerging. One such strategy is preferred capital, where both limited partners and general partners can raise additional capital at net asset value whilst preserving ownership of their portfolio and its future upside.

A related alternative to a secondary sale is net asset value (NAV) lending, in which a fund, or an investor holding fund interests, borrows against the net asset value of its portfolio rather than selling it. Proceeds are used to make distributions to investors, to fund follow-on investments and add-on acquisitions, or to provide interim liquidity between capital calls. In the twelve months to June 2025 NAV loans carried interest rates of 4% to 7%, compared with fixed returns in the low teens or higher for preferred equity, whilst limited partner portfolios sold in the secondary market in 2025 at an average of 87% of net asset value (92% for buyout funds and 78% for venture and growth funds). In July 2024 the Institutional Limited Partners Association published guidance recommending that general partners seek approval from the limited partner advisory committee before using NAV facilities to fund distributions.

Additionally, an increasing number of pension funds, sovereign wealth funds, and family offices (or multi-family offices) have become active participants in the secondary market.

=== Largest Private Equity Secondaries ===
Data is taken from The Secondaries Investor Top 50 2024 list, with this summarizing the top 10 private equity firms by capital raised.

	Firm	Headquarters	2024 Capital raised ($m)
1	Ardian	(France) Paris	49,664
2	Blackstone Strategic Partners	(United States) New York City	49,581
3	Lexington Partners	(United States) New York City	36,700
4	Goldman Sachs	(United States) New York City	34,581
5	HarbourVest Partners	(United States) Boston	30,586
6	StepStone Group	(United States) La Jolla	23,164
7	LGT Capital Partners	(Switzerland) Pfaeffikon	22,266
8	Pantheon Ventures	(United Kingdom) London	17,089
9	Coller Capital	(United Kingdom) London	16,839
10	Partners Group	(Switzerland) Zug	15,582

== History ==
=== Early history (pre-2000) ===
In the 1980s and 1990s, secondaries were seen as an obscure or informal market but grew rapidly in the late 1990s and beyond. It began to receive meaningful attention in the 2000s when annual transaction volume regularly began to surpass $1 billion. The origin of secondaries is often traced back to VCFA Group and its founder Dayton Carr, as one of the first investment firms to begin purchasing private equity interests in existing funds as well as direct secondary interests in private companies from 1982 onwards. Carr later setup with Arnaud Isnard ARCIS in the early 90s, which also specialised in secondaries.

A number of firms started to focus on secondaries from the late 1980s up to the mid-1990s, and continue to be influential in the secondaries market today. In 1988, Pantheon Ventures launched Pantheon International Participation, one of the earliest dedicated secondary funds. Coller Capital was founded the following year, a firm focused primarily on acquiring existing limited partnership interests in private equity funds and portfolios of direct private company investments. Landmark Partners was also established in 1989 by Stanley Alfeld, John Griner, and Brent Nicklas, with a strategy encompassing both secondary and primary fund investments. In 1994, Nicklas and Landmark colleague Richard Lichter left the firm to establish Lexington Partners, another prominent secondary market investor. Partners Group was founded in 1996 and emerged as a key participant in the expansion of the secondary market. Collectively, these five firms have consistently ranked among the largest private equity firms globally by capital raised for secondary funds.

Transactions through most of the 1990s were typically small, typified by Landmarkâs 1992 acquisition of a $157 million portfolio of LBO fund interests from Westinghouse Credit Corporation and VCFAâs purchase of the Northrop Grumman Ventures portfolio of assets also in 1992. Secondary volume was estimated to exceed $1 billion for first time in 1997 as deal size began to increase. In 1998, Coller Capital and Partners Group completed a US$265 million joint venture transaction to acquire Royal Dutch Shellâs portfolio of limited partnership interests from its United States Pension Trust, which at the time was the largest secondary market deal ever completed. The deal was substantially larger than previous deals, and from this point forward, deals grew in size annually for a prolonged period. Crossroads Group acquired a $340 million portfolio of direct investments in large and mid-cap companies from Electronic Data Systems (EDS) in 1999.

=== Emerging Niche Market in the Early 2000s ===
In the years immediately following the dot-com crash, many investors sought an early exit from their outstanding commitments to the private equity asset class, particularly venture capital. As a result, the nascent secondary market became an increasingly active sector within private equity in these years. In 2000, Coller Capital and Lexington Partners completed the purchase of over 250 direct equity investments valued at nearly $1 billion from National Westminster Bank. Lexington Partners and Hamilton Lane also acquired a $500 million portfolio of private-equity fund interests from Chase Capital Partners. The following year, in 2001, Coller Capital acquired 27 companies owned by Lucent Technologies, kick-starting the evolution of the market for "secondary direct" or "synthetic secondary" interests.

=== Continued Expansion in the Mid-2000s ===
In 2003, HarbourVest acquired a $1.3 billion of private-equity fund interests in over 50 funds from UBS AG through a joint-venture transaction That same year, Deutsche Bank sold a $2 billion investment portfolio to a consortium of secondary investors, led by AlpInvest Partners (formerly by NIB Capital), to form MidOcean Partners. The following year, in 2004, Bank One sold a $1 billion portfolio of private-equity fund interests to Landmark Partners and the State of Connecticut Retirement and Trust completed the sale of a portfolio of private-equity fund interests to Coller Capital, representing one of the first secondary market sales by a US pension. Abbey National completed the sale of Â£748m ($1.33 billion) of LP interests in 41 private-equity funds and 16 interests in private European companies, to Coller Capital.

Large LP portfolio transactions continued to emerge in 2005 when Dresdner Bank sold a $1.4 billion private-equity funds portfolio to AIG and Lexington Partners and AlpInvest Partners acquired a portfolio of private-equity fund interests from Dayton Power & Light, an Ohio-based electric utility.

During this period Secondaries transaction volume increased from historical levels of 2% or 3% of annual private-equity commitments to 5% or roughly 1% of the addressable market representing all existing private equity assets in circulation. Many of the largest financial institutions (e.g., Deutsche Bank, Abbey National, UBS AG) sold portfolios of direct investments and "pay-to-play" funds portfolios that were typically used as a means to gain entry to lucrative leveraged finance and mergers and acquisitions assignments but had created hundreds of millions of dollars of losses.

The surge in activity in the secondary market between 2004 and 2007 also prompted new entrants to the market. It was during this time that the market evolved from what had previously been a relatively small niche into a functioning and important area of the private-equity industry. Prior to 2004, the market was still characterized by limited liquidity and distressed prices with private-equity funds trading at significant discounts to fair value. Beginning in 2004 and extending through 2007, the secondary market transformed into a more efficient market in which assets for the first time traded at or above their estimated fair values and liquidity increased dramatically. During these years, the secondary market transitioned from a niche sub-category in which the majority of sellers were distressed to an active market with ample supply of assets and numerous market participants. By 2006, active portfolio management had become far more common in the increasingly developed secondary market, and an increasing number of investors had begun to pursue secondary sales to rebalance their private-equity portfolios. The continued evolution of the private-equity secondary market reflected the maturation and evolution of the larger private-equity industry.

Secondaries market growth accelerated as the mid-2000s buyout boom picked up steam culminating in the milestone California Public Employees' Retirement System (CalPERS) transaction in which it sold a $2.1 billion portfolio of legacy private-equity funds at the end of 2007, after an extensive first-of-its-kind auction process managed by UBS Investment Bank. The ultimate buying group included Oak Hill Investment Management, Conversus Capital, Lexington Partners, HarbourVest, Coller Capital, and Pantheon Ventures. The CalPERS transaction came closely on the heels of other UBS-managed auctions for Ohio Bureau of Workers' Compensation which sold a $650 million portfolio of private-equity fund interests to a consortium of buyers led by Pomona Capital as well as MetLife which sold $400 million portfolio of private-equity fund interests to CSFB Strategic Partners.

=== 2008 financial crisis ===
As a result of the 2008 financial crisis, pricing in the market fell steadily as the supply of interests began to greatly outstrip demand and the outlook for leveraged buyout and other private-equity investments worsened. Financial institutions, including Citigroup and ABN AMRO as well as affiliates of AIG and Macquarie Bank, were prominent sellers.

With the crash in global markets from in the fall of 2008, more sellers entered the market including publicly traded private equity vehicles, endowments, foundations and pension funds. Many sellers were facing significant overcommitments to their private-equity programs and in certain cases significant unfunded commitments to new private-equity funds were prompting liquidity concerns. With the dramatic increase in the number of distressed sellers entering the market at the same time, the pricing level in the secondary market dropped rapidly. In these transactions, sellers were willing to accept major discounts to current valuations (typically in reference to the previous quarterly net asset value published by the underlying private-equity fund manager) as they faced the prospect of further asset write-downs in their existing portfolios or as they had to achieve liquidity under a limited amount of time.

At the same time, the outlook for buyers became more uncertain and a number of prominent secondary players were slow to purchase assets. In certain cases, buyers that had agreed to secondary purchases began to exercise material-adverse-change (MAC) clauses in their contracts to walk away from deals that they had agreed to only weeks before.

Private-equity fund managers published their December 2008 valuations with substantial write-downs to reflect the falling value of the underlying companies. As a result, the discount to net asset value offered by buyers to sellers of such assets was reduced. However, activity in the secondary market fell dramatically from 2008 levels as market participants continued to struggle to agree on price. Reflecting the gains in the public-equity markets since the end of the first quarter, the dynamics in the secondary market continued to evolve. Certain buyers that had been reluctant to invest earlier in the year began to return and non-traditional investors were more active, particularly for unfunded commitments, than they had been in previous years.

After the 2008 financial crisis, many financial institutions began divesting large portfolios of private equity assets through secondaries. In 2008, ABN AMRO sold a portfolio of private-equity interests in 32 European companies managed by AAC Capital Partners to a consortium comprising Goldman Sachs, AlpInvest Partners, and CPP for $1.5 billion., in 2010 Lloyds Banking Group plc sold a portfolio comprising 33 fund interests, primarily European mid-market funds, for a value of $730m to Lexington Partners. In a separate transaction Lloyds sells a Â£480 million portfolio to Coller Capital through a joint venture. Citigroup sold a $1 billion portfolio of funds interests and co-investments to Lexington Partners. Also, Bank of America sold a portfolio comprising 60 fund interests for a value of $1.9 billion to AXA Private Equity. Finally, in early 2011, CalPERS sold an $800 million portfolio of private-equity funds to AlpInvest Partners.

=== Continued Expansion in the 2010s ===
Since mid-2010, the secondary market has seen increased levels of activity resulting from improved pricing conditions. Through the middle of 2011, the level of activity has continued to remain at elevated levels as sellers have entered the market with large portfolios, the most attractive funds being transacted at around NAV. As the Euro area crisis hit the financial markets during summer 2011, the private-equity secondary market subsequently saw a decrease both in supply and demand for portfolios of interests in private-equity fund, leading to reduced pricing levels compared to pre-summer-2011. However, the volumes on the secondary market were not expected to decrease in 2012 compared to 2011, a record year as, in addition to the banks under pressure from the Basel III regulations, other institutional investors, including pension funds, insurance companies and sovereign wealth funds continued to utilize the secondary market to divest assets.

In terms of fundraising, secondary investment firms have been the beneficiaries of the gradually improving private-equity fundraising market conditions. From 2010 through 2013, each of the large secondary fund managers have raised successor funds, sometimes exceeding their fundraising targets.

By 2012, secondary market activity was setting new records with approximately $26bn of transactions completed. Lloyds Banking Group plc sold a $1.9bn portfolio of private-equity funds to Coller Capital. New York City Employees Retirement System sold a $975 million portfolio of private-equity fund interests. State of Wisconsin Investment Board sold a $1 billion portfolio of large buyout fund interests. Swedish Länsförsäkringar sold a €1.5bn PE portfolio.

Growth in the secondary market continued trending upward in 2013 reaching its highest level yet, with an estimated total transaction volume of $36bn. Average discount to net asset value decreased from 35% in 2009 to 7% in 2013. Total transaction volume grew again in 2014 to $49.3bn.

During the four-year period between 2014 and 2018, the secondaries market continued its upward trajectory, approaching $40 billion in transaction volume in the second half of 2017. The figure represents approximately five times total deal activity from 2005 levels. Market watchers attributed the rise to the growing sophistication of secondaries transactions, increased demand for liquidity on the part of institutional investors and a growing number of fund managers using the secondary market to gain access to new streams of capital.

=== Emergence of the GP-Led Market ===
The period also gave rise to GP-led restructurings, in which a fund manager leads efforts to restructure the economics of the fund or roll existing fund commitments into a new vehicle. According to Credit Suisse, GP-led secondaries have grown from 10 percent of the market in 2012 to over a third by the end of 2017. Market insiders predict GP-led secondaries to eventually reach 50 percent of market share by the end of 2018, attributing a growing acceptance of their use among marquee private-equity firms such as Warburg Pincus and BC Partners as cause for their mainstream acceptance.

== See also ==
- Private equity
- NAV lending
- List of private-equity firms
- Venture capital
- History of private equity and venture capital
