= Expro =

International energy service company

- Type: Publicly held company
- Traded as: NYSE: XPRO
- Industry: Energy
- Founded: 1938; 88 years ago
- Headquarters: Houston, Texas
- Key people: Michael Jardon (Chief executive officer)
- Products: Well Construction, Well Flow Management, Subsea Well Access and Well Intervention and Integrity
- Revenue: US$1.4 billion (2022)
- Number of employees: >6,500
- Website: expro.com

Expro is an energy services provider headquartered in Houston, Texas, United States.

== History ==
The company was founded by J. Trewhella, J. Ross and H. Green in 1973 at Great Yarmouth as Exploration & Production Services (North Sea) Ltd with the objective of carrying out well testing in the North Sea. In 1986, about 84% of the company was acquired by Flextech from whom the management subsequently bought out the business in 1992. The company was first listed on the London Stock Exchange in 1994. In 2006, it acquired PowerWell Services, another leading well management concern, for $674.5 million.

=== Takeover ===
In May 2008, Halliburton made a £1.7 billion takeover of the business, while a competing bid worth £1.8bn was made the following month by Umbrellastream, a Candover-led consortium also comprising Goldman Sachs and Alpinvest. An improved bid from Halliburton was then rejected by the Expro board, a position backed by the High Court after an appeal lodged by a group of activist shareholders. The acquisition of Expro by Umbrellastream was completed in July 2008.

In 2017, the company filed for Chapter 11 bankruptcy protection.

In March 2021 Expro announced a merger with Frank's International. The merger was completed in October 2021 and began trading under NYSE:XPRO.
