= Collateralized fund obligation =

Type of financial instrument

A collateralized fund obligation (CFO) is a form of securitization involving private equity fund or hedge fund assets, similar to collateralized debt obligations. CFOs are a structured form of financing for diversified private equity portfolios, layering several tranches of debt ahead of the equity holders.

The data made available to the rating agencies for analyzing the underlying private equity assets of CFOs are typically less comprehensive than the data for analyzing the underlying assets of other types of structured finance securitizations, including corporate bonds and mortgage-backed securities. Leverage levels vary from one transaction to another, although leverage of 50% to 75% of a portfolio's net assets has historically been common.

The various CFO structures executed in recent years have had a variety of different objectives resulting in a variety of different structures. These differences tend to relate to the amount of equity sold through the structure as well as to the leverage levels.

== Basic structure of a CFO ==
Generally, money is allocated into several different tranches by investors based on priority. A tranche is described as a security that can be divided into small portions and then sold in those portions to an investor. From the tranches the funds are then invested into a special purpose vehicle (SPV). SPVs are developed solely for the purpose of a CFO.

== Private equity CFOs ==
Since the advent of CFOs (c. 2002), there have been only a handful of publicly announced private equity securitization transactions. Typically, owners of private equity assets will securitize a portfolio of funds as a way of generating liquidity without an outright secondary sale of the funds.

- In 2006 Temasek Holdings completed $810 million securitization of a portfolio of 46 private equity funds.
- SVG Capital has executed three CFO securitizations as part of its "Diamond" program, SVG Diamond (2004), SVG Diamond II (2006) and SVG Diamond III (2007).
- Alongside its CLO program, Mizuho IM has launched its first CFO called Vintage I in 2007, a EUR 500 million fund investing in global buyout funds. The investment has proved extremely successful so far. Now under the ownership of 3i Group, the Vintage team closed a second US$400 million Vintage II.
- Tenzing (2004) — Securitization of private equity fund assets by Invesco
- Pine Street (2003) — Securitization of private equity fund assets by AIG
- Silver Leaf (2003) — Securitization of private equity fund assets by Deutsche Bank

== See also ==
- Collateralized mortgage obligation
- Private equity secondary market
