= Manager of managers investment =

"Manager of managers" (MoM) is an investment approach by institutions who proprietary manage capital. Different investment managers are selected and investment mandates given to them. The allocated capital is then managed in Separate Managed Accounts by the respective selected asset managers. It is a solution often offered by big asset management divisions from investment banks but also independent alternative asset managers like hedge fund firms or private equity firms. The solution is typically applied by investors when investing in alternatives as simple investments as government bonds or money market investments can be managed by one single asset management firm like BlackRock.

A Separate Managed Account has the following advantages:

- Lower management fees and in some cases lower performance fees.
- It can give the investor the right to invested in specific deals only. The mandated manager can have multiple main funds with different inception dates and different asset classes. From them, the manager can pick specific deals and co invest the separate managed accounts money according to parameters set or desires by the investor. E.g., an investor may only want to invest in energy deals and avoid investing in takeovers of companies who are at the brink of bankruptcy.
- It can also include some manager's main funds where assets are commingled from multiple investors.

Separate Managed Accounts are only offered by asset managers when huge sums are being planned to allocate to their firm. Thus, investors who pursue the MoM strategy are often pension funds, sovereign wealth funds, university endowments or insurers.

At independent alternative specialized firms, when it is not part of the manager's offerings, such a solution may be only offered in rare cases. Such a case may be when the investor has some leverage, e.g., a pension fund who commits hundreds of millions of dollars every 5 years to a single firm. However, some alternative firms like private equity firms like The Carlyle Group, Inc., are marketing Separately Managed Accounts under their Global Investment Solutions division.

The assumption underpinning MoM is that diversification and balance can be achieved more readily by having a group of specialists, instead of one or multiple in house individuals who are solely employed for the purpose of proprietary investing. In addition, the e.g., pension fund manager may lack experience in certain asset classes or the operational aspect of an alternative investing division. They may not offer salaries and bonuses that are competitive compared to specialized asset managers like hedge funds due to the nature of a pension fund. The additional advantages associated with a Separately Managed Account, still allow the investor to construct a portfolio according to their needs and guidelines.

== See also ==
- Investment management
