= Pantheon Ventures =

British private equity firm

Pantheon Ventures (UK) LLP

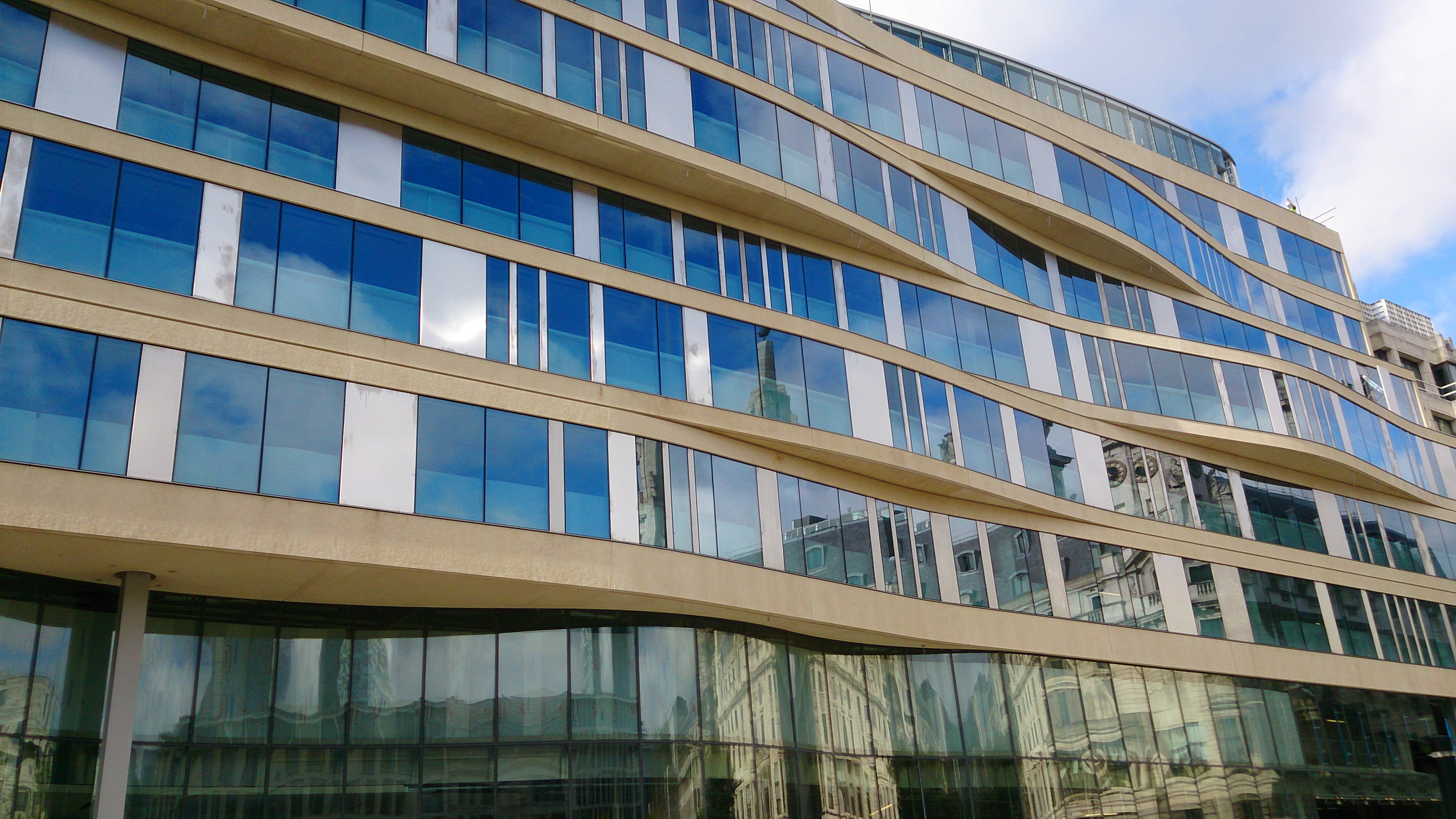
- Headquarters in London
- Type: Subsidiary
- Industry: Private Equity
- Founded: 1982; 44 years ago
- Headquarters: London, United Kingdom
- Key people: Paul Ward
- Products: Fund of funds, Secondaries, Co-investment, Infrastructure, Separate Accounts
- AUM: US$60.9 billion (2023)
- Number of employees: 350 (100 investment professionals)
- Parent: Affiliated Managers Group
- Website: www.pantheon.com

Pantheon is a private equity, infrastructure, real assets and debt investor that invests on behalf of over 660 investors, including public and private pension plans, insurance companies, endowments and foundations. Founded in 1982, Pantheon has developed an established reputation in primary, direct co-investment and secondary private assets across all stages and geographies. The firm's investments include customized separate account programs, regional & global primary fund programs, secondaries and co-investment programs. Pantheon manages traditional limited partnership fund vehicles as well as vehicles tailored to the specific requirements of the U.S. private wealth and defined contribution pension markets, and also to investors in UK-listed investment companies, the latter through Pantheon International, a private equity investment trust.

Pantheon has over 340 employees with more than US$55 billion in assets under management (as of June 30, 2020). The firm has operated as an affiliate of Affiliated Managers Group Inc. ("AMG") since its acquisition in mid-2010.

Originally formed in 1981 as the private equity investment division of GT Management in London, Pantheon's management acquired the private equity division in 1988 through a management buyout. Pantheon was then acquired by Russell Investments, an investment management subsidiary of Northwestern Mutual, in 2004.

In 2010, Pantheon was acquired by Affiliated Managers Group ("AMG"), a NYSE-listed asset management company with shareholdings in a diverse group of over 30 mid-sized asset management firms. Pantheon's management acquired a share of the equity in the transaction and maintains independent management and operation of its business.
