= Fund of funds =

Investment strategy

A "fund of funds" (FOF) is an investment strategy of holding a portfolio of other investment funds rather than investing directly in stocks, bonds or other securities. This type of investing is often referred to as multi-manager investment. A fund of funds may be "fettered", meaning that it invests only in funds managed by the same investment company, or "unfettered", meaning that it can invest in external funds run by other managers.

There are different types of FOF, each investing in a different type of collective investment scheme (typically one type per FOF), for example a mutual fund FOF, a hedge fund FOF, a private-equity FOF, or an investment trust FOF. The original Fund of Funds was created by Bernie Cornfeld in 1962. It went bankrupt after being looted by Robert Vesco.

== Features ==
Investing in a collective investment scheme may increase diversity compared with a small investor holding a smaller range of securities directly. Investing in a fund of funds may achieve greater diversification. According to modern portfolio theory, the benefit of diversification can be the reduction of volatility while maintaining average returns. However, this is countered by the increased fees paid both at FOF level and at the level of the underlying investment fund.

== Considerations ==
Management fees for FOFs are typically higher than those on traditional investment funds because they include the management fees charged by the underlying funds.

In its article on Funds of Funds, Investopedia notes that, "Historically, a fund of funds showed an expense figure that didn't always include the fees of the underlying funds. As of January 2007, the SEC began requiring that these fees be disclosed in a line called 'Acquired Fund Fees and Expenses' (AFFE)."

After allocation of the levels of fees payable and taxation, returns on FOF investments will generally be lower than what single-manager funds can yield. However, some FOFs waive the second level of fees (the FOF fee) so that investors only pay the expenses of the underlying mutual funds.

Pension funds, endowments and other institutions often invest in funds of hedge funds for part or all of their "alternative asset" programs, i.e., investments other than traditional stock and bond holdings.

The due diligence and safety of investing in FOFs has come under question as a result of the Bernie Madoff investment scandal, where many FOFs put substantial investments into the scheme. It became clear that a motivation for this was the lack of fees by Madoff, which gave the illusion that the FOF was performing well. The due diligence of the FOFs apparently did not include asking why Madoff was not making this charge for his services. In 2008 and 2009, fund of funds were criticized by investors and the media over their fees and the quality of their due diligence, particularly after the Bernie Madoff fraud.

These strategic and structural issues have caused fund-of-funds to become less and less popular. Nonetheless, fund-of-funds remain important in particular asset classes, including venture capital and for particular investors in order for them to be able to diversify their too low or too high level of assets under management appropriately.

== Asset allocation ==
The FOF structure may be useful for asset-allocation funds, that is, an "exchange-traded fund (ETF) of ETFs" or "mutual fund of mutual funds". For example, iShares has asset-allocation ETFs, which own other iShares ETFs. Similarly, Vanguard has asset-allocation mutual funds, which own other Vanguard mutual funds. The "parent" funds may own the same "child" funds, with different proportions to allow for "aggressive" to "conservative" allocation. This structure simplifies management by separating allocation from security selection.

=== Target-date fund ===
A target-date fund is similar to an asset-allocation fund, except that the allocation is designed to change over time. The same structure is useful here. iShares has target-date ETFs that own other iShares ETFs; Vanguard has target-date mutual funds that own other Vanguard mutual funds. In both cases, the same funds are used as the asset-allocation funds. Since a provider may have many target dates, this can greatly reduce duplication of work.

== Private-equity funds ==
According to Preqin (formerly known as Private Equity Intelligence), in 2006, funds investing in other private-equity funds (i.e., FOFs, including secondary funds) amounted to 14% of all committed capital in the private-equity market. The following ranking of private-equity FOF investment managers is based on information published by Preqin in 2020:

Rank	Name of the firm	Assets under management (billions of USD)	Headquarters
1	Partners Group	100	Baar, Switzerland
2	Goldman Sachs Alternatives	65	(United States) New York
3	Hamilton Lane	65	(United States) Conshohocken, Pennsylvania
4	HarbourVest Partners	63	(United States) Boston, Massachusetts
5	Pathway Capital Management	62	(United States) Irvine, California
6	Fort Washington Investment Advisors	52	(United States) Cincinnati, Ohio
7	Pantheon Ventures	47	(United Kingdom) London
8	AlpInvest Partners	42	(United States) New York
9	Adams Street Partners	40	(United States) Chicago, Illinois
10	Caixagest	39	Lisbon, Portugal

== Fund of hedge funds ==
A fund of hedge funds is a fund of funds that invests in a portfolio of different hedge funds to provide broad exposure to the hedge fund industry and to diversify the risks associated with a single investment fund. Funds of hedge funds select hedge fund managers and construct portfolios based upon those selections. The fund of hedge funds is responsible for hiring and firing the managers in the fund. Some funds of hedge funds might have only one hedge fund in them, which lets ordinary investors into a highly acclaimed fund, or many hedge funds.

Funds of hedge funds generally charge a fee for their services, always in addition to the hedge fund's management and performance fees, which can be 1.5% and 15–30%, respectively. Fees can reduce an investor's profits and potentially reduce the total return below what could be achieved through a less expensive mutual fund or exchange-traded fund (ETF).

== Venture capital fund of funds ==
A venture capital fund of funds is a fund of funds that invests in a portfolio of different venture capital funds for access to private capital markets. Clients are usually university endowments and pension funds.

== See also ==
- Collective investment scheme
- Investment management
- Manager of managers fund
- Bernard Cornfeld, operator of perhaps the first "Fund of Funds" from 1962 until its collapse in 1970. .
- Sovereign wealth fund
- Boutique investment bank
- List of exchange-traded funds
