= Equity co-investment =

Minority investment

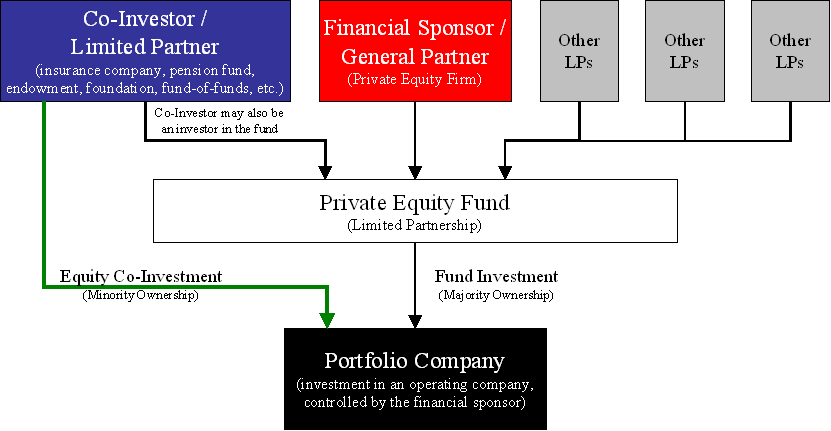
Diagram of the structure of an equity co-investment in a portfolio company alongside a financial sponsor

An equity co-investment (or co-investment) is a minority investment, made directly into an operating company, alongside a financial sponsor or other private equity investor, in a leveraged buyout, recapitalization or growth capital transaction. In certain circumstances, venture capital firms may also seek co-investors.

== Overview ==
Typically, co-investors are existing limited partners in an investment fund managed by the lead financial sponsor in a transaction. Unlike the investment fund however, co-investments are made outside the existing fund and as such co-investors rarely pay management fees or carried interest on an individual investment. Co-investments are typically passive, non-controlling investments, as the private equity firm or firms involved will exercise control and perform monitoring functions. For large private equity fund of funds and other investors, co-investments are a means of increasing exposure to attractive transactions and making investments that have a higher return potential because of the lower economics paid to the general partner. As a result, many private equity firms offer co-investments to their largest and most important investors as an incentive to invest in future funds.

== Benefits ==
Private equity firms seek co-investors for several reasons. Most important of these is that co-investments allow a manager to make larger investments without either dedicating too much of the fund's capital to a single transaction (i.e., exposure issues) or sharing the deal with competing private equity firms. Co-investors bring a friendly source of capital.

Co-investment shows benefits for those looking to reduce costs. The types of costs reduced are both fixed and variable. These costs typically are split between the parties involved in the co-investments. Compared to a direct investment where the limited partner is inquiring every cost.

== Limitations ==
Comparing both direct and co-investments, direct investments typically have better returns than co-investments. Co-investments involve multiple people pulling together their funds and allocating a fund manager to hinder the deal. Whereas, direct investing there is no collaboration, and the owner of the fund has control of what area they have their assets allocated to. Some drawbacks of co-investment include: a slow deal process, negative impacts on relationships with limited partners, as well as additional costs.

Forming a relationship for co-investment opportunities has its drawbacks. Susanna K. and David D. argue that social status and experience are two forms that co-investment opportunities rely on and can provide great limitations for deals to go through. Experience may create bias for investors looking for a partnership on a co-investment opportunity. Social status is a contributing factor for investor partnerships as well. Investors with a high standing in status, generally have more co-investment opportunities and are sought out.

== See also ==
- Private equity
- Fund of funds
- Financial sponsor
