= Institutional Venture Partners =

American investment firm

IVP
- Type: Private
- Industry: Venture capital
- Founded: 1980; 46 years ago
- Founder: Reid Dennis
- Headquarters: Menlo Park, California, U.S.
- AUM: $7.0 billion
- Number of employees: ~30+
- Website: www.ivp.com

Institutional Venture Partners (IVP) is an American venture capital firm focused on fast-growing technology companies. IVP was founded in 1980, as one of the first venture capital firms in Silicon Valley.

== History ==
Reid W. Dennis, the founder of Institutional Venture Partners, began his venture investment career in 1952, while an analyst with the Fireman's Fund Insurance Company. He began by making an individual investment into Ampex, a technology company that developed audio tape products. He also developed an informal network of screened individual investors (now called angel investors).

In 1974, Dennis secured a $5 million commitment from American Express and formed Institutional Venture Associates. The new firm then raised $19 million from six insurance companies for its first fund. That figure represented nearly half of all the capital raised in the United States that year by private venture capital partnerships. IVA's assets under management grew to $180 million by the end of the decade.

In 1980, the two other partners in IVA left to form their own funds. Dennis then changed IVA's name to Institutional Venture Partners and raised a $22 million fund. Among the investments from that first IVP fund were Seagate, LSI Logic, and Stratus Technologies. Another fund was raised in 1982, this time for $40 million, and more funds soon followed. In 1983 Mary Jane Elmore became a general partner, making her one of the first female venture capital partners in the United States.

In 1988, the firm was able to raise $115 million for its fifth fund. Dennis brought on a new partner, Norm Fogelsong, in 1989. Four other partners would eventually join the firm as well, including Ruthann Quindlen in 1994. In 1999, three partners from IVP joined with three partners from Brentwood Venture Capital to form two new firms: Redpoint Ventures, which would specialize in early stage digital media and internet companies, and Versant Ventures, which would focus on health science investments. The split into three firms allowed IVP to continue to manage its own portfolio and invest in fast-growing technology companies.

By 2008, IVP had invested in around 200 companies and executed around 85 IPOs, including Seagate, TiVo, and Netflix.

Dennis stepped down from his position as general partner ahead of the firm's twelfth fund in 2010, which raised $600 million. Two years later, the firm raised $1 billion for its fourteenth fund. This fund was the largest in IVP's history and brought the firm's total committed capital to $4 billion with a portfolio that included Buddy Media, Dropbox, and Twitter. IVP's sixteenth fund raised $1.5 billion in 2017, its seventeenth fund raised $1.8 billion in 2021, and its eighteenth fund raised $1.6 billion in 2024.

In August 2023, IVP opened its first international office in London. The expansion to Europe reflected the firm's growing portfolio of European startups, including DeepL, MySQL, Supercell, Supermetrics, UiPath, and Wise.

Dennis died in March 2024.

== Operations and investments ==
In an interview with TechCrunch, general partner Jules Maltz said that IVP wants to focus "on the 10 to 12 fastest growing, most prominent late stage tech companies each year, and fund those businesses.”

IVP opens individual venture funds and then asks for financial commitments from limited partners. Limited partners in IVP's funds have historically included university endowments, public pension funds, funds of funds, and wealthy individuals. Every IVP fund has different fund managers.

The firm is headquartered in Menlo Park, California. It also maintains offices in London and San Francisco.

Notable investments
Year	Companies
2020s	DeepL, Discord, Supermetrics, Perplexity.ai, Cradle
2010s	Amplitude, ArcSight, Buddy Media, Coinbase, CrowdStrike, Datadog, Deputy,Dropbox, Grammarly, HashiCorp, LegalZoom, Rubrik, Slack, Snap, Supercell, Wise
2000s	HomeAway, Kayak, LifeLock, Marketo, MySQL, Twitter
1980s–1990s	Juniper Networks, Netflix, Polycom, Seagate
