= Chicken Salad Chick =

Fast casual food chain

- Company logo
- Industry: Fast casual restaurant chain and franchise
- Founded: 2008; 18 years ago in Auburn, Alabama
- Founders: Stacy and Kevin Brown
- Headquarters: Atlanta, Georgia
- Number of locations: over 340 (2026)
- Products: Chicken salad, sandwiches, side dishes, and desserts
- Website: chickensaladchick.com

Chicken Salad Chick is a fast casual restaurant chain and franchise of chicken salad restaurants currently based in Atlanta, Georgia. To date, the chain consists of over 340 franchise restaurants and stores in 25 different U.S. states.

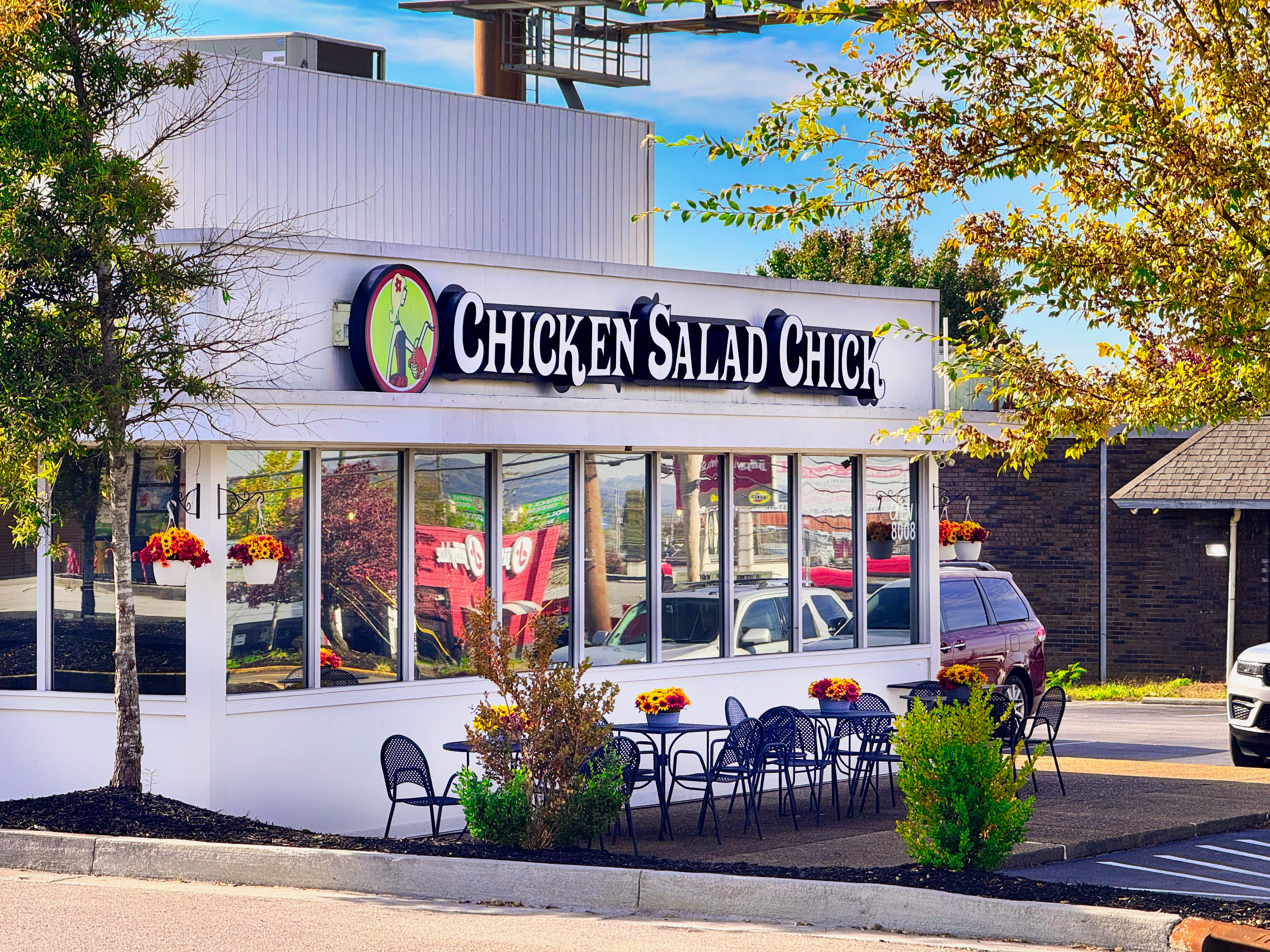
Chicken Salad Chick in Knoxville, Tennessee

The restaurants, similar to Chick-fil-A, are shut down Sunday in certain communities, plus Thanksgiving and Christmas.

== History ==
The company started with Stacy Brown, who was unemployed, divorced, and raising three children. She started selling her homemade chicken salad door-to-door in Auburn, Alabama. With the health department prohibiting the sale of foods cooked in one's home, Stacy and her future husband Kevin Brown devised a plan to open a restaurant.

In 2016, Chicken Salad Chick was ranked #37 on the Inc. 5000 list of fastest-growing companies in the U.S.

The restaurant is partially owned by private equity firm Brentwood Associates, which also has investments in Blaze Pizza and Lazy Dog Restaurant & Bar.

== Fare ==
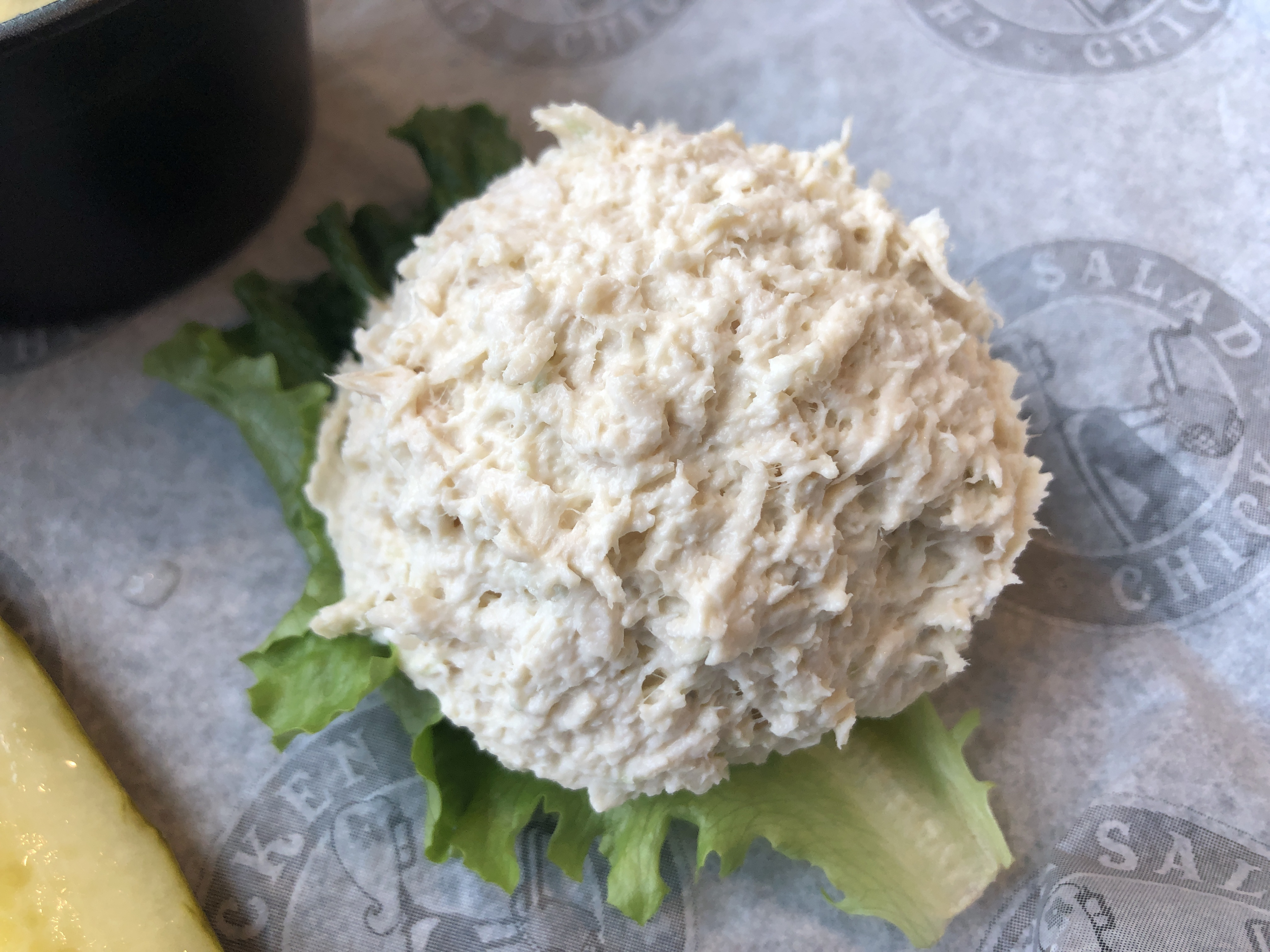
A scoop of the Classic Carol at a Chicken Salad Chick restaurant

The restaurant serves fifteen styles of chicken salad, served on bread, lettuce as a scoop with crackers, or in a leafy green salad. It also provides chicken salad by the pound for take-out and delicatessen-style sandwiches and side dishes.

The restaurant's menu includes pimento cheese, egg salad, broccoli salad, fruit salad, macaroni and cheese, pasta salad, and grape salad. Daily soup specials include tomato bisque, broccoli & cheese, chicken & artichoke florentine, and chicken tortilla; loaded potato soup is available daily.

== Philanthropy ==
The Chicken Salad Chick Foundation was founded by the company in August 2014 and is a partner with the American Cancer Society. The foundation also partners with food banks in communities with Chicken Salad Chick restaurant locations in efforts to nourish people in need. For example, in 2014, the foundation donated over $6,000 to the Chattanooga Area Food Bank. Since the foundation's inception, Chicken Salad Chick restaurants have served to generate "more than $100,000 in donations to fight cancer and hunger in the communities it serves". Barclay Smith is the director of the foundation.

== See also ==
- List of chicken restaurants
- List of casual dining restaurant chains
