= Atomic electron transition =

Change of an electron between energy levels within an atom

An electron in a Bohr model atom, moving from quantum level n = 3 to n = 2 and releasing a photon. The energy of an electron is determined by its orbit around the atom, The n = 0 orbit, commonly referred to as the ground state, has the lowest energy of all states in the system.

In atomic physics and chemistry, an atomic electron transition (also called an atomic transition, quantum jump, or quantum leap) is an electron changing from one energy level to another within an atom or artificial atom. These energy levels are discrete, quantized, and obtain unique energy gaps specific to a given atom. Though not an exhaustive list, energy-dispersive X-ray spectroscopy (EDS) and X-ray photoelectron spectroscopy (XPS) are a few of the many characterization techniques that employ the "atomic fingerprint" phenomenon of atomic electron transitions obtained by the unique quantized energy levels to identify atomic presence and relative composition within samples.

Electrons can relax into states of lower energy by emitting electromagnetic radiation in the form of a photon. Electrons can also absorb passing photons, which excites the electron into a state of higher energy. The larger the energy separation between the electron's initial and final state, the shorter the photons' wavelength.

== History ==
Danish physicist Niels Bohr first theorized that electrons can perform quantum jumps in 1913. Soon after, James Franck and Gustav Ludwig Hertz proved experimentally that atoms have quantized energy states.

The observability of quantum jumps was predicted by Hans Dehmelt in 1975, and they were first observed using trapped ions of barium at University of Hamburg and mercury at NIST in 1986.

== Theory ==
An atom interacts with the oscillating electric field:

$E(t) = |\textbf{E}_0| Re( e^{-i{\omega}t} \hat{\textbf{e}}_\mathrm{rad} )$	1

with amplitude $|\textbf{E}_0|$, angular frequency $\omega$, and polarization vector $\hat{\textbf{e}}_\mathrm{rad}$. Note that the actual phase is $(\omega t - \textbf{k} \cdot \textbf{r})$. However, in many cases, the variation of $\textbf{k} \cdot \textbf{r}$ is small over the atom (or equivalently, the radiation wavelength is much greater than the size of an atom) and this term can be ignored. This is called the dipole approximation. The atom can also interact with the oscillating magnetic field produced by the radiation, although much more weakly.

The Hamiltonian for this interaction, analogous to the energy of a classical dipole in an electric field, is $H_I = e \textbf{r} \cdot \textbf{E}(t)$. The stimulated transition rate can be calculated using time-dependent perturbation theory; however, the result can be summarized using Fermi's golden rule:
$$Rate \propto |eE_0|^2 \times | \lang 2 |
\textbf{r} \cdot \hat{\textbf{e}}_\mathrm{rad} |1 \rang |^2$$
The dipole matrix element can be decomposed into the product of the radial integral and the angular integral. The angular integral is zero unless the selection rules for the atomic transition are satisfied.

== Electromagnetic radiation interactions ==
In order to excite an electron to a higher energy level, an incident photon or radiative force must come into and be absorbed by the atom and hit an electron with the exact energy necessary to complete a transition to a given higher energy level. The energy gaps between quantized energy levels of atoms are on the same scale as ultraviolet (UV) and X-ray radiation; therefore, it can be understood that the gaps between energy levels are on the order of hundreds of nanometers or smaller. The Franck-Condon principle states that, due to nuclear motion being much slower in comparison to electronic motion, the electronic transitions occur in a linear fashion and will only result in an excitation to an energy level if the incident radiation is equivalent in energy to the energy gap and if the probability of the initial and final wave functions overlap significantly. Lasers of UV and X-ray wavelengths can be used to probe such electronic excitations. The time scale of a quantum jump has not been measured experimentally. However, the Franck–Condon principle binds the upper limit of this parameter to the order of attoseconds.

Just as energy must go into and be absorbed by a system (atom) to excite an electron, either radiative or non-radiative emission occurs when an electron relaxes to a lower energy level. The subsequent radiative emission is also on the order of nanometers and can be detected in numerous ways.

=== Techniques employing electromagnetic radiation for electronic transitions ===
- UV-Vis Spectroscopy - Visible and/or ultraviolet light is shined on a sample to probe its contents. Either the intensity of light passed through (transmittance) or the lack of light transmitted (absorbance) is detected and plotted on a spectrum.
- Energy-dispersive X-ray Spectroscopy - A high-energy electron beam hits a sample and ejects electrons from the core electron shells of an atom. As electrons fall to lower energy levels to fill the vacancies, X-rays characteristic of the atom are the emitted. EDS is a common form of characterization used for elemental identification of a sample's composition.
- X-ray photoelectron spectroscopy - Incident X-rays are used to excite electrons on a sample surface. Electrons from the surface are then ejected with their respective energies and abundances being detected. Because different atoms have different binding energies, this type of characterization can also be used for determining elemental composition of synthesized materials.

== Recent discoveries ==
In 2019, it was demonstrated in an experiment with a superconducting artificial atom consisting of two strongly-hybridized transmon qubits placed inside a readout resonator cavity at 15 mK, that the evolution of some jumps is continuous, coherent, deterministic, and reversible. On the other hand, other quantum jumps are inherently unpredictable.

== See also ==
- Burst noise
- Ensemble interpretation
- Fluorescence
- Glowing pickle demonstration
- Molecular electronic transition, for molecules
- Phosphorescence
- Quantum jump
- Spontaneous emission
- Stimulated emission
