= Glowing pickle demonstration =

Scientific demo involving electrocution of pickles

Glowing pickle demonstration

Applying electric current across a pickle causes it to glow. A moist pickle contains salt as a result of the pickling process, which allows it to conduct electricity. Ions of sodium and other substances within the pickle emit light as a result of atomic electron transitions.‍ The pickle only glows at the bottom end because it is where the brine (salt water) collects. The glowing pickle is used to demonstrate ionic conduction and atomic emission in chemistry classes,‍ and also as a demonstration in lighting classes.‍

The first known fully documented demonstration was in a 1989 report from Digital Equipment Corporation.‍ Although this was published as a full technical note and written up as a scientific paper, the publication date, April Fools' Day of that year, gives some indication as to the light-hearted nature of the document. Martin Gardner wrote in 2012 that it was unclear why a pickle only glows on one side, but an experiment in 2026 at Portland State University in Oregon showed that this is because it is always the bottom side where the brine collects.

== In popular media ==
Don Herbert (popularly known as Mr. Wizard) performed the glowing pickle demonstration on his Mr. Wizard's World television show on the Nickelodeon channel in 2013.

== Experimental setup ==
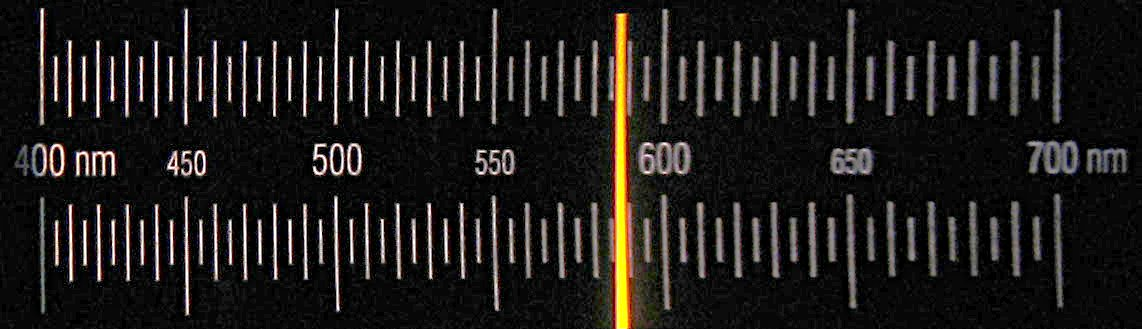
Emission spectrum of sodium.

The traditional form of this demonstration uses commercially purchased pickled cucumbers, which produce a yellow-orange emission due to the 589.0/589.6 nm Sodium doublet line pair originally observed by Josef Fraunhofer in 1817. Variations on this basic setup, using alternative salt solutions for the pickling step or different vegetables are sometimes used.

In 1993, Jeffrey Appling et al described the use of this demonstration as an alternative to the traditional flame test or the use of low-pressure gas emission tubes. He suggested the use of dill pickles in preference to sweet pickles because the former have higher salt concentrations and produce a less noxious odor during the demonstration. He examined the emission spectrum of a pickle energized by a 115V alternating current supply over a range of wavelengths and found no lines other than the sodium doublet. Appling explained the flashing effect which is observed as probably coming from sodium atoms in gas pockets generated near the electrodes, with the glowing being caused by the bulk of the pickle acting as a diffuser.

In 1996, Weimer and Battino described their experiences using other types of produce including onions, potatoes, cabbage, and grapefruit. They prepared their vegetables using 10 days of immersion in a 15% salt solution. The potatoes and cabbage were used with no special preparation, but the onions had to be either cut into 2-inch (51 mm) slabs or peeled, and the grapefruits cut into 1 inch (25 mm) slabs, to ensure adequate diffusion of the brine. Running the demonstration with a 110 V supply resulted in an initial current draw of 6-7 A during a two-minute warm-up period which dropped to below 1 A once the pickle started to glow. Using a 210 V supply resulted in the warm-up period being reduced to 5-10 s. Weimer and Battino presented anecdotal evidence of this demonstration being used as early as 1987. In a companion paper, Pirketta Scharlin et al describe their experiences with additional kinds of vegetables including daikon radish, rhubarb, leek, pumpkin, and zucchini, a variety of salts, and variations of brine concentrations, voltages, and marination times. Recommended concentrations for the various brine solutions were computed to yield about 50% of the theoretical maximum solubility for each salt species at 20 C. They reported good results using voltages as low as 70 V.

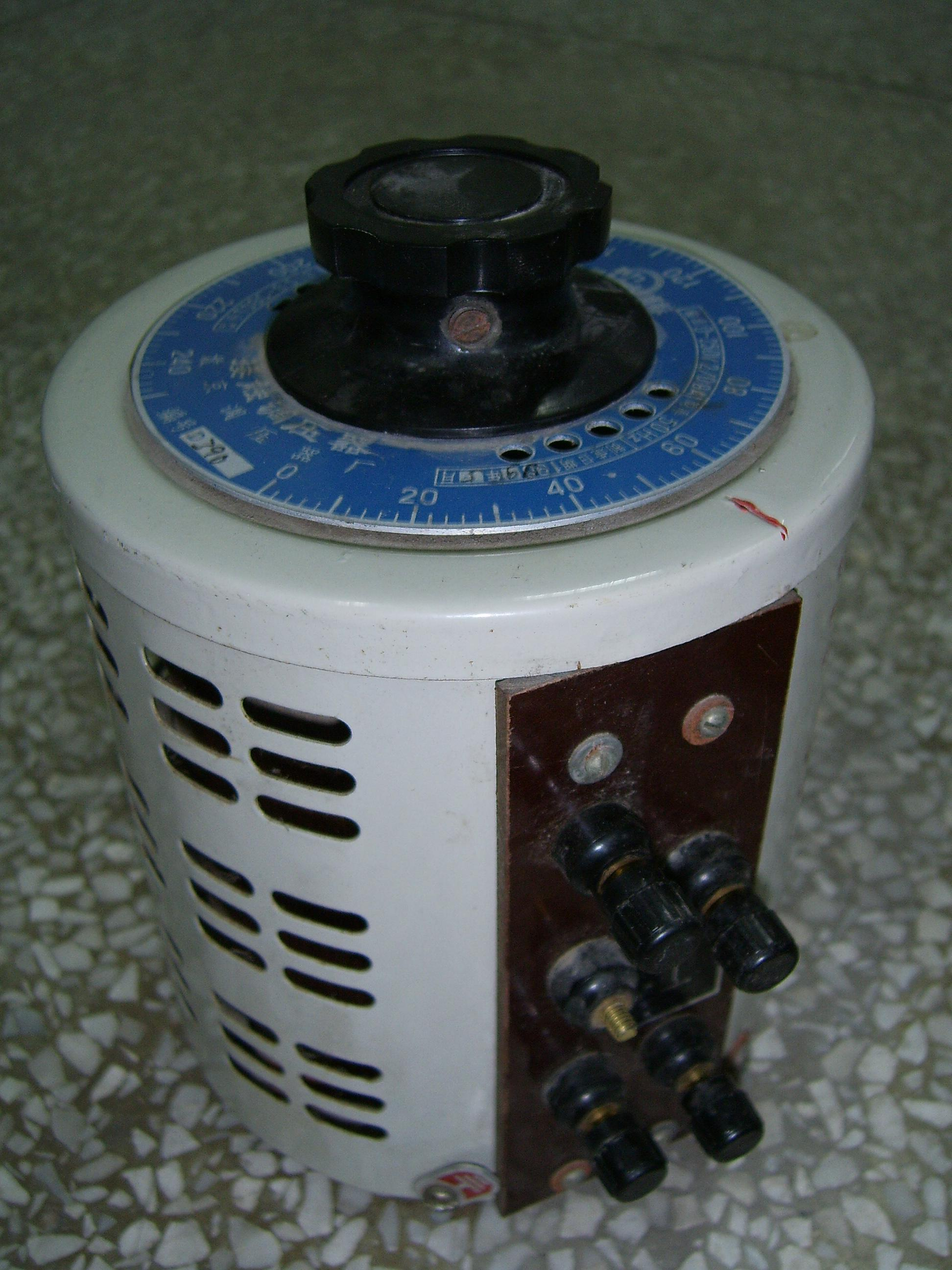
A variable transformer

In 2005, Michelle Rizzo et al described using commercially available cucumbers which are soaked in 30% H_{2}O_{2} (Hydrogen Peroxide) for one week. This bleaches the green pigmentation of the cucumber's skin so the emission from the salt solution can be more easily seen but leaves the skin structurally intact which simplifies mounting the pickle in a demonstration apparatus. After bleaching, the cucumbers were soaked for another week in 10% solutions of various salts in white vinegar (5% acetic acid). Salts used include lIthium (LiCl), potassium (KCl), strontium (SrCl), and barium (BaCl_{2}) chlorides. These result in pink, purple, red, and yellow glows, respectively. The brightest emissions are the 612 and 682 nm lines from lithium (pink) and the 606, 669, and 779 nm lines for strontium (bright red). Copper(II) salts result in a brilliant green, but also degrade the cucumber's structural integrity making it difficult to demonstrate in a classroom setting. A Variac (autotransformer) was be used to adjust the voltage applied to the pickle, which both increases safety and reduces the risk of overloading the electrical supply mains. The traditional setup uses metal household items such as forks or nails to supply electricity to the pickle; use of a tungsten rod provides a better connection which does not corrode as quickly. A commercially available screw-mount light socket can be used hold the pickle securely.

== See also ==
- Lemon battery – Simple battery made with a lemon for educational purposes
- Food chemistry – Study of chemical processes in food
