= Versant Ventures =

American Healthcare investment firm

Versant Venture Management, LLC
- Type: Private
- Industry: Venture capital
- Founded: 1999; 27 years ago
- Headquarters: One Sansome Street, San Francisco, California, U.S.
- Key people: Brad Bolzon (Chairman)
- AUM: US$4.2 billion (2023)
- Website: www.versantventures.com

Versant Ventures ("Versant") is an American Venture capital firm headquartered in San Francisco, California. It is focused on making investments in the healthcare and biotechnology industries.

== Background ==
In 1999 at the end of the Dot-com bubble, several partners from Brentwood Associates joined with partners from Institutional Venture Partners and Crosspoint Ventures to create two separate industry-focused firms, Redpoint Ventures which focused on technology and Palladium Venture Capital which focused on healthcare. Palladium Venture Capital was later renamed to Versant Ventures. Versant was established in Menlo Park.

After its establishment, Versant raised $250 million for its first fund, Versant Venture Capital I.

In the mid-2000s, Versant launched EuroVentures, a business incubator based in Basel, Switzerland that formed startup companies by acquiring assets from European drug companies.

In 2011, Versant launched Inception, an incubator based in San Diego that would help create companies using discoveries from academia.

In 2013, Inception expanded into Canada and opened offices in Vancouver and Montreal. Versant also launched another incubator named Blueline Bioscience in Toronto.

In 2015, Versant launched Highline Therapeutics, an incubator based in New York that would launch drug companies out of medical research centers in the state.

In 2017, Versant set up another incubator in Basel named Ridgeline that would help give entrepreneurs access to scientists and wet labs.

Versant invests in companies based in the United States, Canada and Europe. It deploys half its funds towards outside companies and half to developing companies in-house.

Versant is headquartered in San francisco with additional offices in Basel, New York, San Diego, Toronto and Vancouver.
