= Chicken salad =

Salad made with chicken

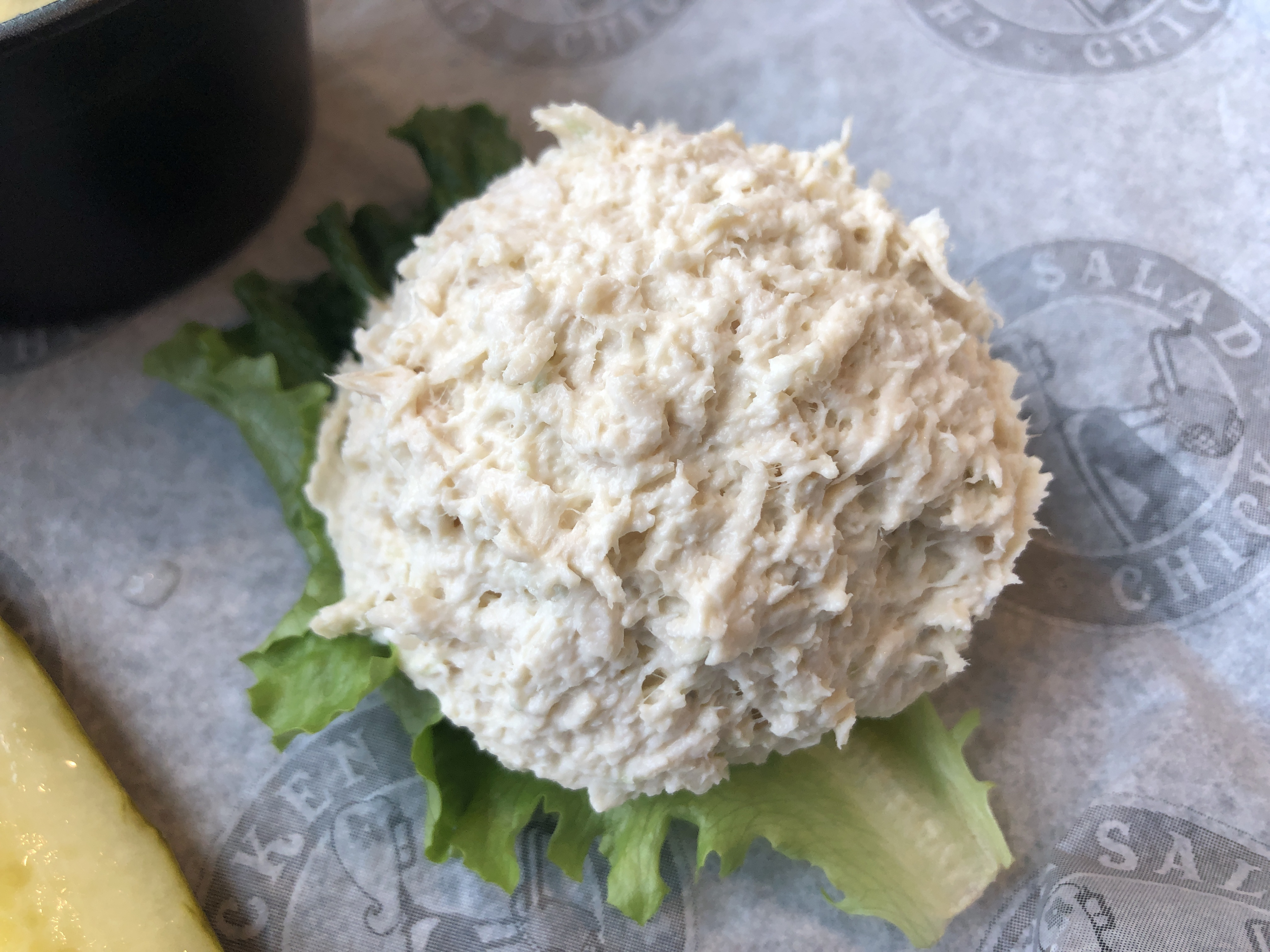
- A chicken salad made with shredded chicken and mayonnaise
- Type: Salad or sandwich
- Region or state: Global
- Main ingredients: Chicken

Chicken salad is any salad with chicken as a main ingredient. Other common ingredients include mayonnaise, hard-boiled egg, celery, onion, pepper, pickles (or pickle relish) and a variety of mustards.

== Description ==
In Canada and the United States and australia, "chicken salad" refers to either any salad with chicken, or a specific mixed salad consisting primarily of chopped chicken meat and a binder, such as mayonnaise, salad dressing or cream cheese. Like tuna salad and egg salad, it may be served on top of lettuce, tomato, avocado, or some combination of these. It may also be used for sandwiches. Typically it is made with leftover cooked or canned chicken. It may also be a garden salad with fried, grilled, or roasted chicken (usually cut up or diced) on top.

In Europe and Asia, the salad may be complemented by any number of dressings, or no dressing at all, and the salad constituents can vary from traditional leaves and vegetables, to pastas, couscous, noodles or rice.

An early 19th-century English recipe for chicken salad appears in Mrs Beeton's Book of Household Management. This is a dish of cold roast chicken placed on lettuce and drizzled with a salad dressing made from mixed mustard, sugar, salad oil, milk, vinegar, cayenne and salt. It is garnished with hard-boiled eggs, cucumber slices and boiled sliced beetroot.

Early American chicken salad recipes can be found in 19th-century Southern cookbooks, including Sarah Rutledge's The Carolina Housewife: Or, House and Home (1847) and Abby Fisher's What Mrs. Fisher Knows About Old Southern Cooking (1881). Rutledge details a recipe for "A Salad To Be Eaten With Cold Meat Or Fowl" that explains how to make a mayonnaise from scratch, before adding it to cold meats (chicken and seafood).

A SALAD TO BE EATEN WITH COLD MEAT OR FOWL. The yolk of a raw egg, a tea-spoonful of made mustard, (it is better if mixed the day before,) half a tea-spoonful of salt. The mustard and salt to be rubbed together; then add the egg. Pour on very slowly the sweet oil, rubbing hard all the time, till as much is made as is wanted. Then add a table-spoonful of vinegar. When these ingredients are mixed, they should look perfectly smooth. If it curdles, add a little more mustard, or a little vinegar. With shrimps or oysters, a little red pepper rubbed in, is an improvement.

— Sarah Rutledge, The Carolina Housewife: Or, House and Home (1847)

Abby Fisher similarly describes making a homemade mayonnaise, before adding it to chicken and white celery.

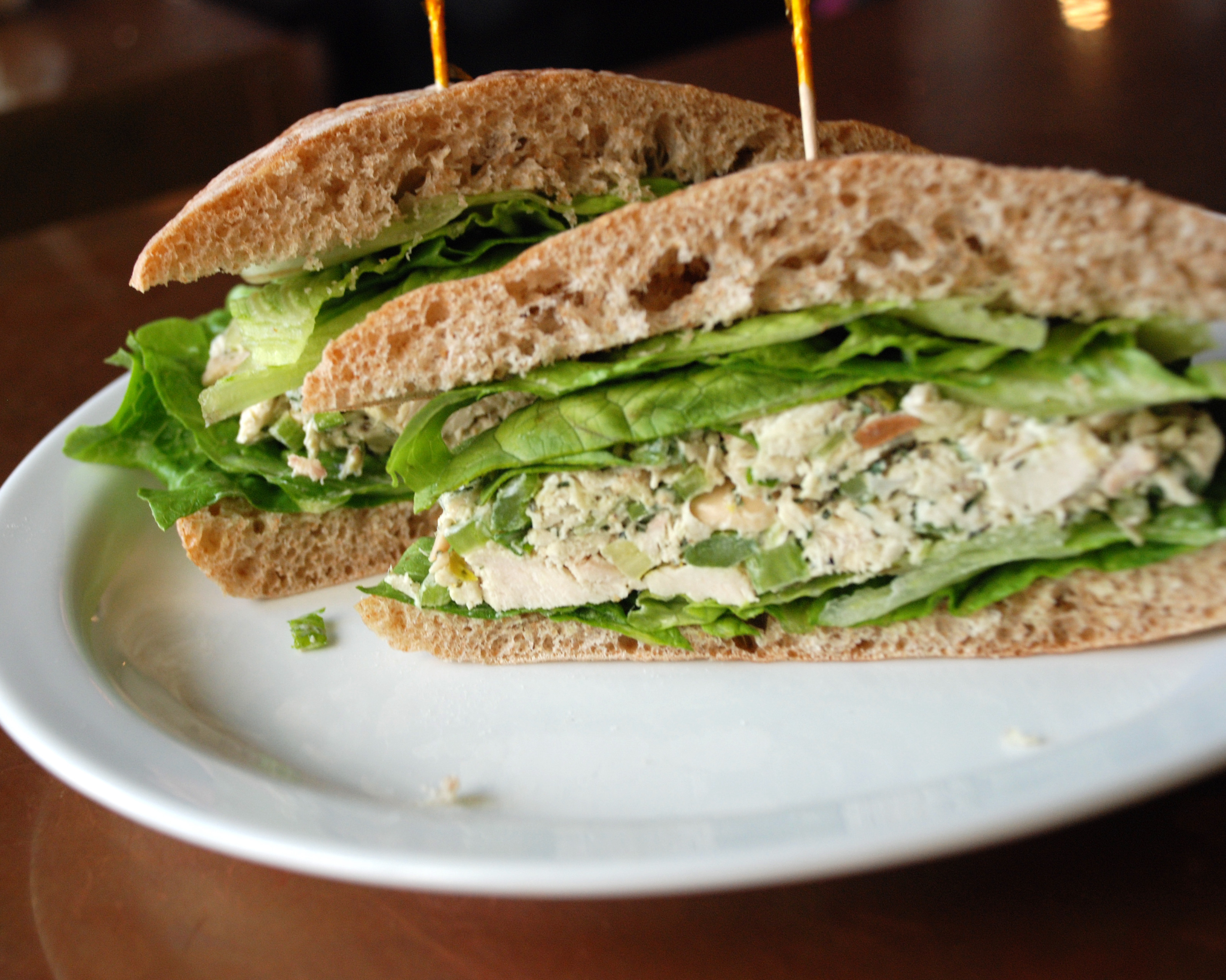
A chicken salad sandwich

Chicken salad is among the Fourth of July foods listed by The American System of Cookery (1847).

== See also ==
- Chicken Salad Chick − a fast casual chain restaurant that specializes in chicken salad
- Chicken sandwich
- List of chicken dishes
- List of sandwiches
- Coronation chicken
- Chinese chicken salad
