= The Teaching Company =

American media production company

The Great Courses
- Type: Private
- Industry: Education
- Founded: 1990; 36 years ago
- Founders: Thomas M. Rollins
- Headquarters: Chantilly, Virginia, United States
- Products: The Great Courses
- Owner: Brentwood Associates (2006–present)
- Website: TheGreatCoursesPlus.com

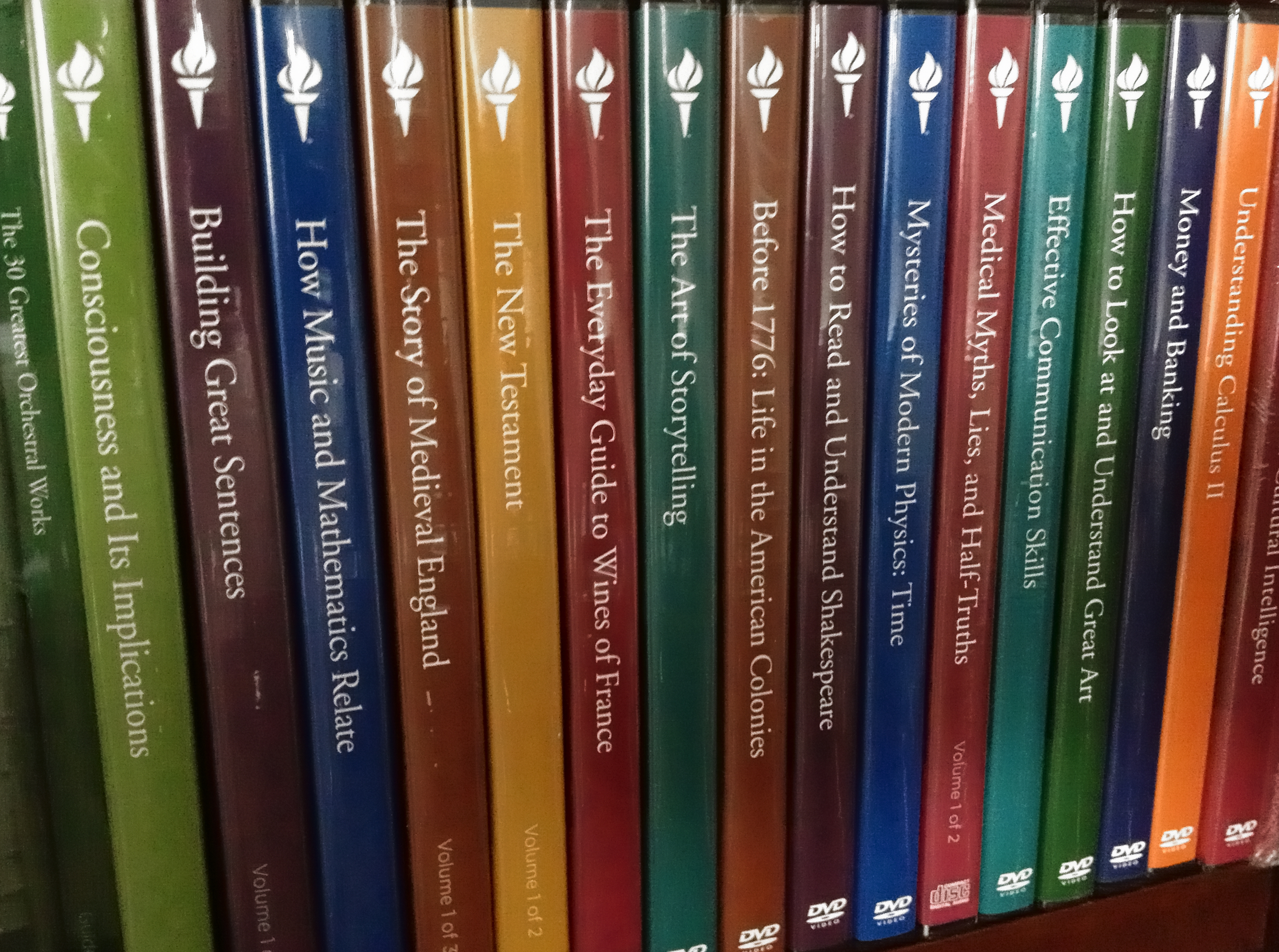
Some of the course materials produced by The Teaching Company, July 2013

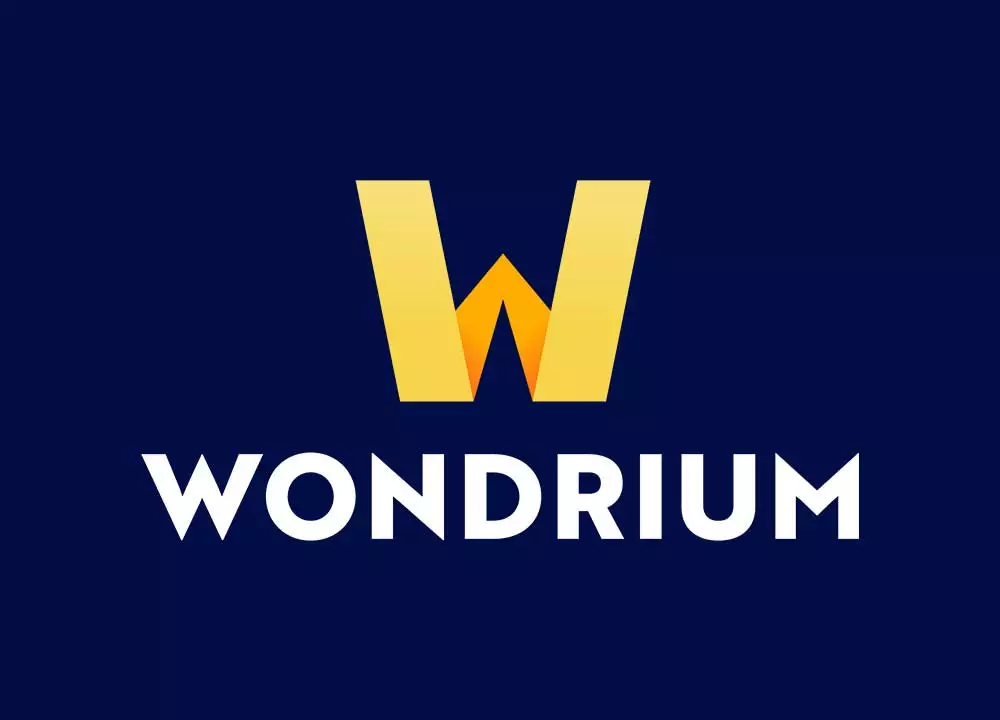
A former company logo

The Teaching Company, doing business as The Great Courses Plus and formerly Wondrium, is a media company which produces educational courses, documentaries, and series. The company distributes their content globally through a mix of direct-to-consumer models

The Teaching Company, founded by Tom Rollins in 1990. It is currently owned by Brentwood Associates PE.

== History ==
In 1990, the company was founded by Thomas M. Rollins, former chief counsel of the United States Senate Committee on Labor and Human Resources. He had been inspired by a 10-hour video-taped lecture series by Irving Younger which he watched to prepare for an exam while at Harvard Law School. He recruited professors and experts to record lectures, with the first courses covering psychology, political theory, and Shakespeare.

By 2000, the company was well-established, with about $20 million (USD) in annual revenue. In October 2006, the company was acquired by Brentwood Associates, a private equity investment firm. After the acquisition, over 6,000 hours of content were digitized, and the number of courses circulated rose from 20 million to 70 million. Sales increased more than 35% the first year and continued to grow at a double-digit pace. The company added indirect distribution channels like Netflix and Audible to their business model in 2013.

The company introduced its online subscription service in 2015 called The Great Courses Plus, which gave consumers streaming access to the majority of The Great Courses content library through a web browser or iOS, Android, Roku, Apple TV, or Fire TV app. A year later, it introduced The Great Courses Signature Collection, a subset of Great Courses content offered as a subscription video service through third party platforms like Comcast, Apple TV, and Roku Channels.

In 2016, the firm earned $150 million in annual revenue. In April 2021, the company announced the rebranding of its global streaming platform from the Great Courses Plus to Wondrium. Along with the rebranding, the company announced 1,000 hours of new content sourced from licensing agreements with Kino Lorber, MagellanTV, and Craftsy. In 2024, the company abandoned the Wondrium name and rebranded again, changing the name back to The Great Courses Plus.

As of 2021, it included over 7,500 hours of content in the format of documentaries, independent films, docuseries, short-form series, featurettes, courses, and tutorials. There are over 1,200 titles with more than 26,000 lectures.

== Content ==
The Great Courses Plus produces educational video and audio content with the promise of learning outcomes. The Wondrium line of content also focuses on learning experiences outside of the influence of traditional university curriculum and takes other forms of content outside of courses such as documentaries, docuseries, and travelogues. The Great Courses line of content typically features University level experts and professors presenting in-depth learning across multiple lectures. Courses are developed by the experts and the company's production team. Many of the programs' episodes are around thirty minutes.

The production quality of the courses is "a cut above" free courses offered on YouTube, according to a report in The New York Times. President and CEO of Wondrium, Paul Suijk, said that the company is the "Netflix of learning."

Content covers different subjects and categories such as science, math, economics, literature, language, history, religion, philosophy, fine arts, music, better living, health, wellness, how-to courses, personal enrichment, hobbies and leisure, and travel. The company has partnerships with The Culinary Institute of America, the Smithsonian Institution, the Mayo Clinic, National Geographic, Penguin Random House, Scientific American, and others. Self-described fans include Bill Gates and George Lucas, who delivered taped opening remarks to a Great Courses conference in 2015.

=== Professors and experts ===
Most programs are delivered by experts in their respective field. The lectures often involve computer graphics and animations; some offer an optional PDF guidebook to serve as a custom-made textbook for the course.

=== Audio-only titles available through Audible ===
While many of The Great Courses titles are available through Audible under The Great Courses brand, the company also produces a line of audio-only titles exclusively for the Audible Originals brand. As of 2022, the company had produced over 75 of those titles including:

- The Life and Times of Beethoven (Robert Greenberg: host)
- Falling in Love with Romance Movies (Eric R. Williams: host)
- Raising Curious Kids (Nicholas Provenzano: host)

== Distribution ==
=== The Great Courses Plus ===
The Great Courses Plus is the company's direct-to-consumer subscription streaming service that offers most of what The Great Courses produces as well as additional licensed non-fiction content from select partners. The streaming service is distributed globally. In 2021, it offered about 7,500 hours of content with three pricing options: a monthly plan, a quarterly plan, and an annual plan. It is available on mobile, web, and platforms including Apple TV, Roku, Amazon Fire TV, iOS, and Android. Wondrium offers both video streaming and audio streaming.

=== The Great Courses Signature Collection ===
The Great Courses Signature Collection is the second streaming subscription service offered by the company that is distributed by third parties, including Comcast, Roku Channels, Amazon Channels, YouTube, and Apple TV, and focuses specifically on The Great Courses line of content. It contains a limited portion of the total count of Wondrium, and The Great Courses produces and releases it relative to the Wondrium streaming service. This collection consists of more than 300 courses on subjects such as philosophy, ancient and modern history, photography, professional development, science and cooking. As of 2024, courses are offered both through a subscription to The Great Courses library and for individual purchase.

=== Audible ===
In 2013, courses were made available through Audible under the Great Courses brand. In 2019, the two companies announced their plan to create new audio-only nonfiction titles. The first three titles were Conspiracies and Conspiracy Theories: What We Should Believe - and Why, Medieval Myths and Mysteries, and No Calculator? No Problem!: Mastering Mental Math.

=== Great Courses (TheGreatCourses.com) ===
The titles are available to purchase digitally, audio or video, or on DVD. Customers can choose from over 1,200 titles in subject categories including the arts, science, literature, self-improvement, history, music, philosophy, theology, economics, mathematics, business, professional advancement, photography, and cooking.

=== True History ===
True History is a Free Ad-Supported Television (FAST) channel and it features over 650 hours of nonfiction programming from Wondrium. It is available through SelectTV (FreeCast) Roku, Xumo, and other services.

=== Wondrium Journeys ===
Wondrium Journeys are immersive vacations "designed to bring the company's vast collection of travel courses, videos, documentaries, and series to life." The first vacation was a 9-day, 8-night trip inspired by the company's course Exploring the Mayan World. The vacations are usually in Europe.

== Awards ==
Regional Emmy Award

Going to the Devil: The Impeachment of 1868 (Nominee, 2020)

Buzzies Award

- Imagining Tomorrow’s Entertainment, (Finalist, 2023: Most Innovative Factual Project of the Year)
- Mind-Blowing Science - Season 1 (Nominee, 2021: Science/Long-form)
- John Lewis: Witness to History (Nominee, 2021: History/Short-format)
- Black Inventors: Hair Care and Madame C.J. Walker (Winner: Best History Program/Content—one-off or series—short -short-format)

Webby Award

- John Lewis: Witness to History (Winner, 2021: People's Choice Documentary in History)

AIBs Award

- Solving for Zero (Winner, 2022: Science and Technology - TV/Video)

== Bibliography ==
- Mathews, Linda (March 31, 1996). "Adult Education; No Tests and You Can Hit Rewind". New York Times.
- Nordin, Kendra (January 28, 2003). "From the college lecture hall to your headphones". Christian Science Monitor.
- Sorkin, Andrew Ross (September 5, 2014). "So Bill Gates Has This Idea for a History Class..." New York Times.
