= Kool-Aid pineapples =

American food made by soaking pineapple in Kool-Aid

Kool-Aid pineapples is a dish that is created by soaking pineapple chunks in a mixture of Kool-Aid and sugar for an extended period of time, often leading to the pineapples taking on the colour of the Kool-Aid itself. The dish originates from the earlier invention of Kool-Aid pickles in the 20th century.

Critics of the food have pointed out its high sugar content.
