= Supermetrics =

Finnish software company

- Logo used since 2024

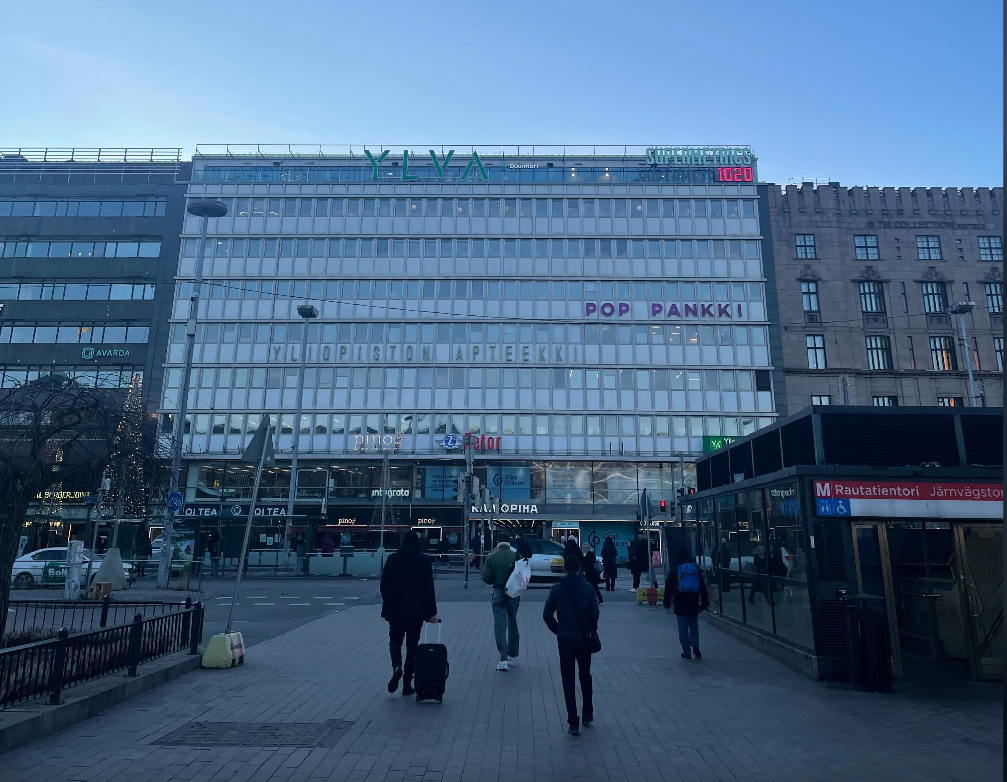
- Type: Private
- Industry: Marketing
- Founded: 2013
- Founder: Mikael Thuneberg
- Headquarters: Helsinki, Finland
- Key people: Anssi Rusi (CEO); Billy Morris (CFO); Duleepa Wijayawardhana (CIO, former CTO)
- Revenue: 55.8 million euros (2023)
- Operating income: 8,000,000 (2020)
- Number of employees: 354 (2023)
- Website: supermetrics.com

Supermetrics Oy is a Finnish software-as-a-service (SaaS) company that develops tools for data integration and marketing intelligence. Headquartered in Helsinki, Finland, the company's core business is to automate the process of collecting data from various online marketing and sales platforms and moving it into reporting, analytics, and data storage destinations. The company has won recognition in Finland for its export success winning Finland's President of the Republic's Internationalization Award (2020) amongst other awards.

The company's origins trace back to 2009, when founder Mikael Thuneberg developed a script to connect the Google Analytics API to Microsoft Excel. After receiving validation for the concept, he formally established Supermetrics as a company in 2013. The company was bootstrapped before securing venture capital funding from investors including a Series A round in 2017 led by OpenOcean, and followed by a Series B round in 2020 led by Highland Europe and IVP.

Initially known for its data pipeline tools, Supermetrics has evolved its offering into a "Marketing Intelligence Platform."

== History ==
=== Origins and conception (2009–2013) ===
The idea for Supermetrics was conceived in 2010 by Mikael Thuneberg, who was working as a web analyst at the time for Sulake for the virtual online game Habbo Hotel. Frustrated with the manual, time-consuming work of transferring data from the recently launched Google Analytics API into Microsoft Excel, he set out to automate the process. Thuneberg developed a set of scripts to create this connection, reportedly motivated by an online forum contest where the first person to succeed would win a Google t-shirt.

This script was later mentioned in the Google Analytics blog. This external recognition confirmed that the problem he had solved for himself was experienced by a wider audience of marketers and analysts.

=== Founding and bootstrapped growth (2013–2017) ===
Supermetrics was formally founded as a company in Helsinki, Finland, in 2013. Thuneberg has stated that he never intended to become a so-called growth company and was focused more on developing the product. Thuneberg worked on the company alone from 2010 until 2016, when the first employee was hired.

The company's financial model was efficient; it was profitable from its first day of operation. This bootstrapped financial performance meant that by 2016, the company reported annual revenues of 1.6 million euros, representing a 151 percent year-over-year increase. It achieved this growth with a net profit margin of 63 percent.

=== Venture funding and expansion (2017–2022) ===
On November 23, 2017, Supermetrics announced its first significant funding round, securing a 3.5 million euros investment. The round was led by OpenOcean, a Finnish venture capital firm founded by key individuals behind the open-source database company MySQL and MariaDB. The stated purpose of the capital injection was to accelerate technology and product innovation and to support a rapid, strategic expansion into new global markets. A Google Data Studio partner at this point, the company established its first sales team in 2018.

In January 2019, the company began collaborating with Microsoft on its Power BI reporting product. In the spring, Supermetrics, together with Google, developed a no-code data warehouse integration for the BigQuery data warehouse. The company opened offices in Lithuania and in Atlanta, Georgia. Because of the COVID-19 pandemic, the Atlanta office was closed after only four months. The company had nearly 50 employees, and its revenue grew approximately 770 percent from 2017 to 2019.

In early 2020, Supermetrics hired its first chief financial officer. The company secured a 40 million euros funding round on August 25, 2020. This round was led by the growth equity firm Highland Europe and included participation from the US venture capital firm IVP, Ilkka Paananen, CEO of Supercell, and Amit Agarwal, Chief Product Officer of Datadog. Thuneberg noted that the selection of these investors was driven more by a desire to acquire strategic expertise and skills than simply to obtain capital.

By the end of 2021, the company had around 200 employees across Finland, Lithuania, and the United States. In 2022, Supermetrics announced it had surpassed 50 million euros in revenue, maintaining a 40 percent year-over-year growth rate. According to public financial information number of employees were reported as 172 in 2021 and 354 in 2023.

The company opened an office in Dublin in 2022.

=== Leadership transition and strategic shift (2023–Present) ===
In January 2023, Supermetrics adopted a dual-CEO model. Anssi Rusi was appointed alongside Thuneberg, having previously served on the board of the Startup Foundation and as an executive at Smartly and Yousician. Rusi was leading the commercial, financial, and operational functions while Thuneberg was concentrating on product development and strategy. The company increased its investment in product development.

In January 2024, Thuneberg became the chairman of the company's board, and the company's strategy was revised under Rusi's leadership. The company began planning to expand its product portfolio into an AI-based marketing management platform, for example through acquisitions. The transformation required rebuilding the company's products and market position, but also renewing the executive team.

In June 2025, Supermetrics acquired the Dutch software company Relay42. Its customer data platform is used by companies such as Air France, KLM, and Levi Strauss & Co. The platform merges data collected from various sources into a single customer profile. The companies planned to offer their customers, by autumn, new AI-agent-driven workflows.

== Organization ==
In 2025, Supermetrics had over 360 employees. They represented more than 40 different nationalities. The company has offices in Dublin, Helsinki, Singapore, and Vilnius.

== Products and services ==
Screenshot of the Supermetrics platform user interface, 2025.

Supermetrics' first products were self-service tools that marketing managers could implement independently. Nowadays the company also offers products which can be integrated customers' own data ecosystems.

=== Data integration ===
The base Supermetrics product is a data integration platform built for marketers, analysts, and data engineers. It functions as a no-code software solution that automates the extraction and transfer of data from a wide array of siloed marketing and sales platforms.

The platform features a library of over 150 connectors to data sources. These include major digital advertising platforms like Google Ads and Facebook Ads, web analytics services such as Google Analytics, social media networks, e-commerce systems like Shopify and Adobe Commerce, and customer relationship management (CRM) systems such as Salesforce. Supermetrics is a HubSpot partner and Google's partner for Looker Studio.

Users can choose to send this aggregated data to a variety of destinations. These fall into three main categories:

1. Spreadsheets: Google Sheets and Microsoft Excel.
2. Business intelligence (BI) and visualization tools: Looker Studio (formerly Google Data Studio) and Power BI.
3. Data warehouses and data lakes: Destinations such as Google BigQuery, Snowflake, Amazon Redshift, and Azure Synapse.

The primary value of this service is the elimination of manual data export and import tasks, which provides a unified view of marketing performance across disparate channels.

=== Marketing intelligence ===
Prior to acquisition of Relay42, Supermetrics began to position its expanded offering as a "Marketing Intelligence Platform". It was a move to offer a more complete tool that helps with every step of handling marketing data.

According to the company the integration of Relay42's Customer Data Platform (CDP) technology will add an "activation" layer to the end-to-end platform. The platform gives marketers a real-time view of marketing performance and customer behavior and new AI-agent-driven workflows that analyze data, draw conclusions based on it, and develop personalized customer journeys.

=== Technology and features ===
To support its platform, Supermetrics offers a range of features.

- Data transformation: The platform provides tools to manipulate data before it reaches its final destination.
- Data automation: Features include for example the ability to schedule automated data refreshes at set intervals.
- Templates: Pre-built, customizable report templates for tools like Looker Studio and Google Sheets.

== Competitive landscape ==
Supermetrics operates within the marketing technology landscape, specifically in the data integration, business intelligence, and analytics sectors. Key competitors include Funnel, Adverity, FiveTran and Stitch (part of Talend) in this space.

In 2020, it was estimated that over ten percent of all digital marketing worldwide was analyzed using Supermetrics’ tools. Around half of the company’s customers were marketing agencies. By 2025, approximately 200,000 organizations in 120 countries were using the company’s services. Its customers included Canon, Dyson, HubSpot, LinkedIn, Nestlé, Pfizer, and Volvo.

According to the company, the acquisition of Relay42 represents a strategic effort to move upmarket and compete more directly with comprehensive data platforms by adding data activation as a key differentiator.

== Recognitions ==
- In 2019, Supermetrics was included in Deloitte's Technology Fast 50 list.
- In 2020, the company received Finland's President of the Republic's Internationalization Award.
- In 2021, Duleepa Wijyawardhana received the CTO of the Year in Finland award in the SMB Category.
- In 2021, Mikael Thuneberg received the Growth Company CEO of the Year award.

== Supermetrics in the Finnish Technology Ecosystem ==
Supermetrics is seen as important in Finland’s technology and startup ecosystem by Finnish media and observers due to its rapid and profitable growth compared to its competitors making it an candidate for being a unicorn.

Alongside other prominent Finnish tech companies such as Wolt, Aiven, and Smartly.io, Supermetrics has contributed to Finland’s increasing reputation source of software startups capable of rapid global scaling. Studies and business media accounts often highlight Supermetrics within Finnish startup scene, particularly in areas like sustainable growth, talent development, investing in employee well-being, and balancing profitable operations with international expansion.
