= Pickled cucumber =

Small pickled and fermented cucumber

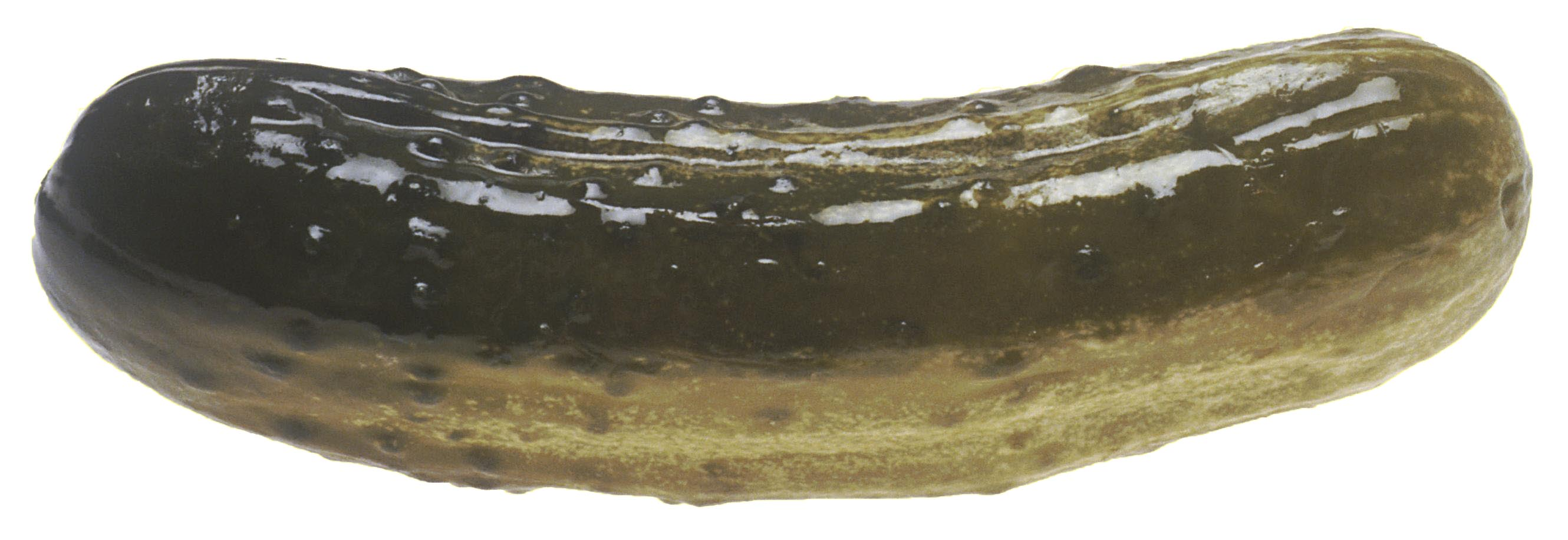
- A deli dill pickle
- Alternative names: Pickle, gherkin
- Course: Hors d'oeuvre
- Main ingredients: Cucumber, brine or vinegar or other solution
- Variations: Cornichon, gherkin

A pickled cucumber – commonly known as a pickle in the United States and Canada and a gherkin (/ˈɡɜːrkɪn/ GUR-kin) in Britain, Ireland, South Africa, Australia and New Zealand – is a usually small or miniature cucumber that has been pickled in a brine, vinegar, or other solution and left to ferment. The fermentation process is executed either by immersing the cucumbers in an acidic solution or through souring by lacto-fermentation. Pickled cucumbers are often part of mixed pickles.

== Historical origins ==
It is often claimed that pickled cucumbers were first developed for workers building the Great Wall of China, though another hypothesis is that they were first made as early as 2030 BC in the Tigris Valley of Mesopotamia, using cucumbers brought originally from India.

According to the New York Food Museum, archaeologists believe ancient Mesopotamians pickled food as far back as 2400 B.C. while, centuries later, cucumbers native to India were being pickled in the Tigris Valley. Ancient sources and historians have documented awareness around the nutritional benefits of pickles thousands of years ago as well as the perceived beauty benefits of pickles— Queen Cleopatra of Egypt credited the pickles in her diet with contributing to her health and legendary beauty.

During World War II, the U.S. government recognized the importance of pickles in soldiers' diets and allocated 40% of the nation's pickle production to the armed forces.

== Types ==
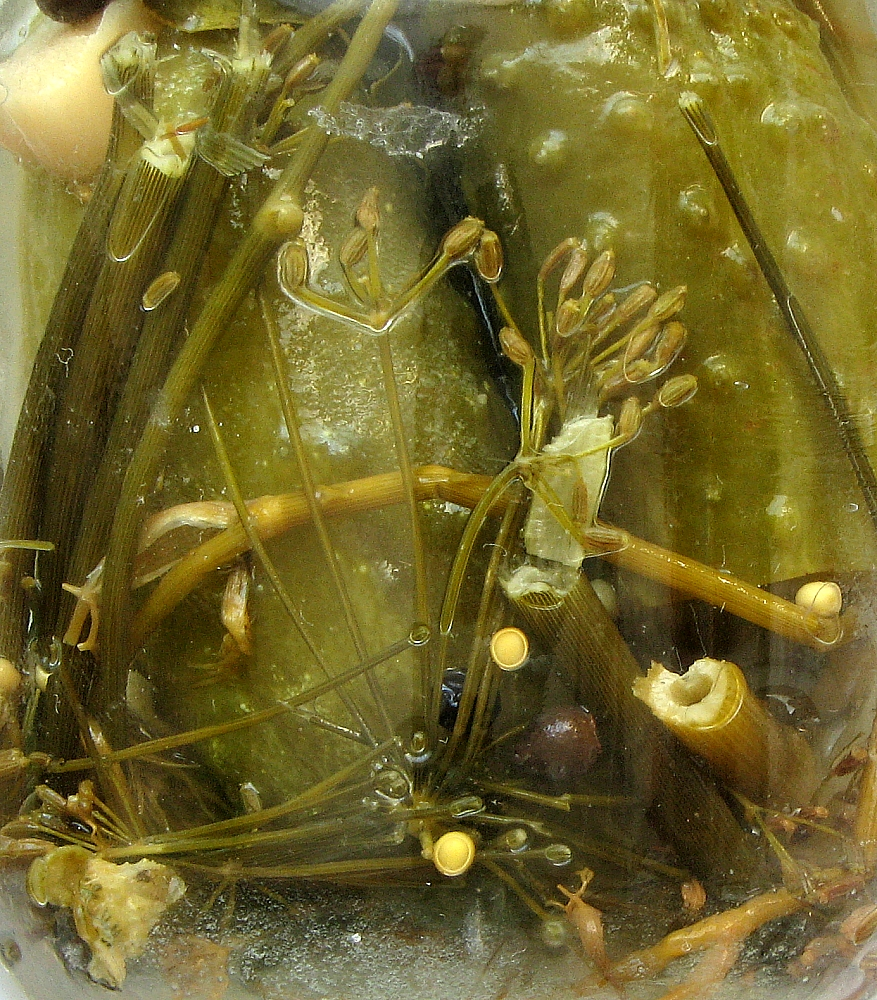
Pickled cucumber in glass jar

Pickled cucumbers are highly popular in the United States and are a delicacy in northern and eastern Europe. Pickled cucumbers are flavored differently in different regions of the world.

=== Brined pickles ===
Brined pickles are prepared using the traditional process of natural fermentation in brine, making them grow sour. The salt concentration in the brine can vary between 20–40 grams per litre (3 1/4–6 1/2 oz/imp gal; 2 3/4–5 1/4 oz/US gal). Vinegar is not needed in the brine of naturally fermented pickled cucumbers.

The fermentation process depends on the Lactobacillus bacteria that naturally occur on the skin of a growing cucumber. These may be removed during commercial harvesting and packing processes. Bacteria cultures can be reintroduced to the vegetables by adding already fermented foods such as yogurt or other fermented milk products, pieces of sourdough bread, or pickled vegetables such as sauerkraut.

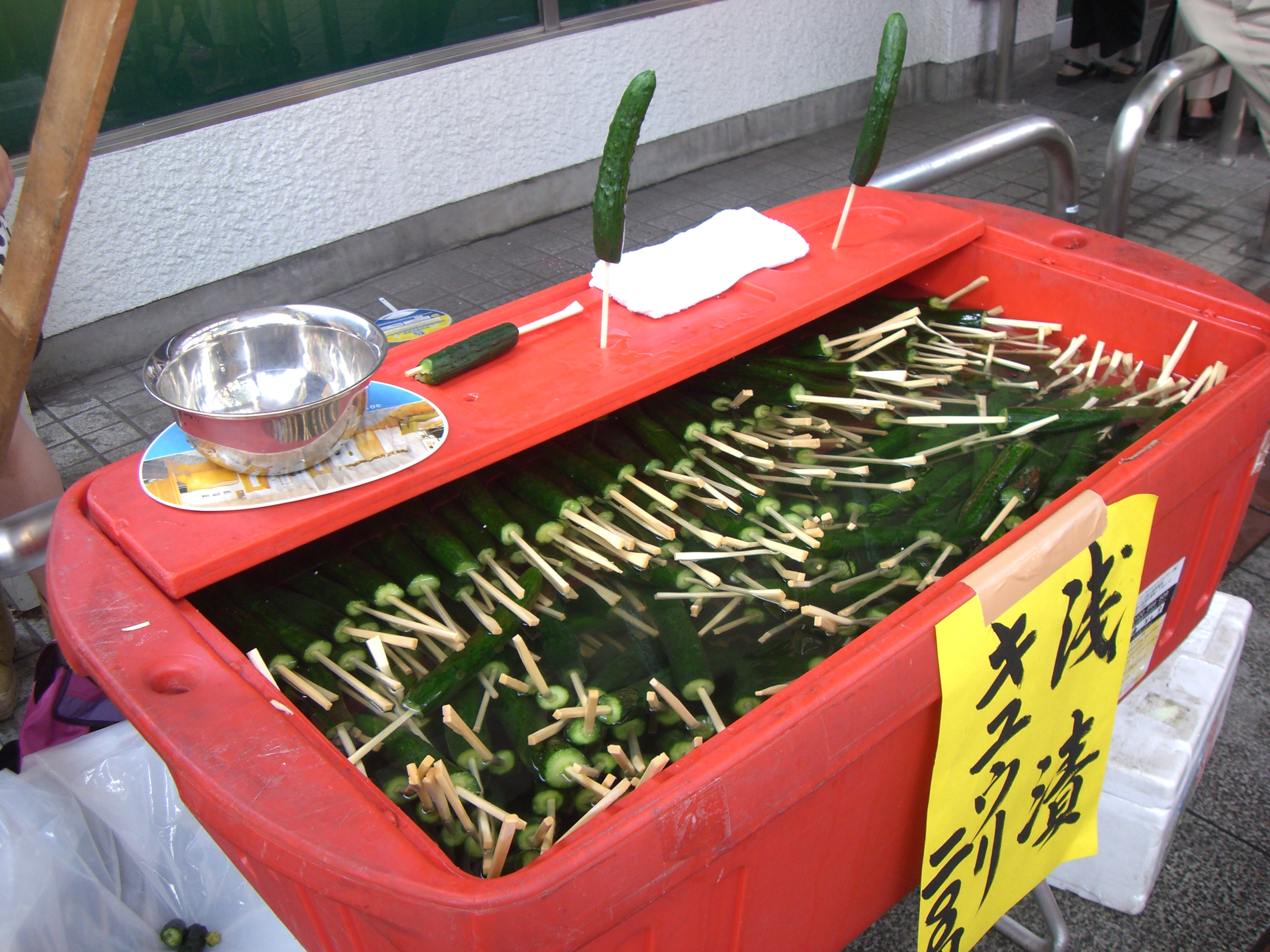
Japanese asazuke pickled cucumbers being sold as street food

Typically, small cucumbers are placed in a glass or ceramic vessel or a wooden barrel, together with various spices. Among those traditionally used in many recipes are garlic, horseradish, the whole dill stems with umbels and green seeds, white mustard seeds, grape, oak, cherry, blackcurrant and bay laurel leaves, dried allspice fruits, and—most importantly—salt. The container is then filled with cooled, boiled water and kept under a non-airtight cover (often cloth tied on with string or a rubber band) for several weeks, depending on taste and external temperature. Traditionally, stones (also sterilized by boiling) are placed on top of the cucumbers to keep them under the water. The cucumber's sourness depends on the amount of salt added (saltier cucumbers tend to be sourer).

Since brined pickles are produced without vinegar, a film of bacteria forms on top of the brine. This does not indicate that the pickles have spoiled, and the film may be removed. They do not keep as long as cucumbers that are pickled with vinegar and usually must be refrigerated. Some commercial manufacturers add vinegar as a preservative.

=== Bread-and-butter ===
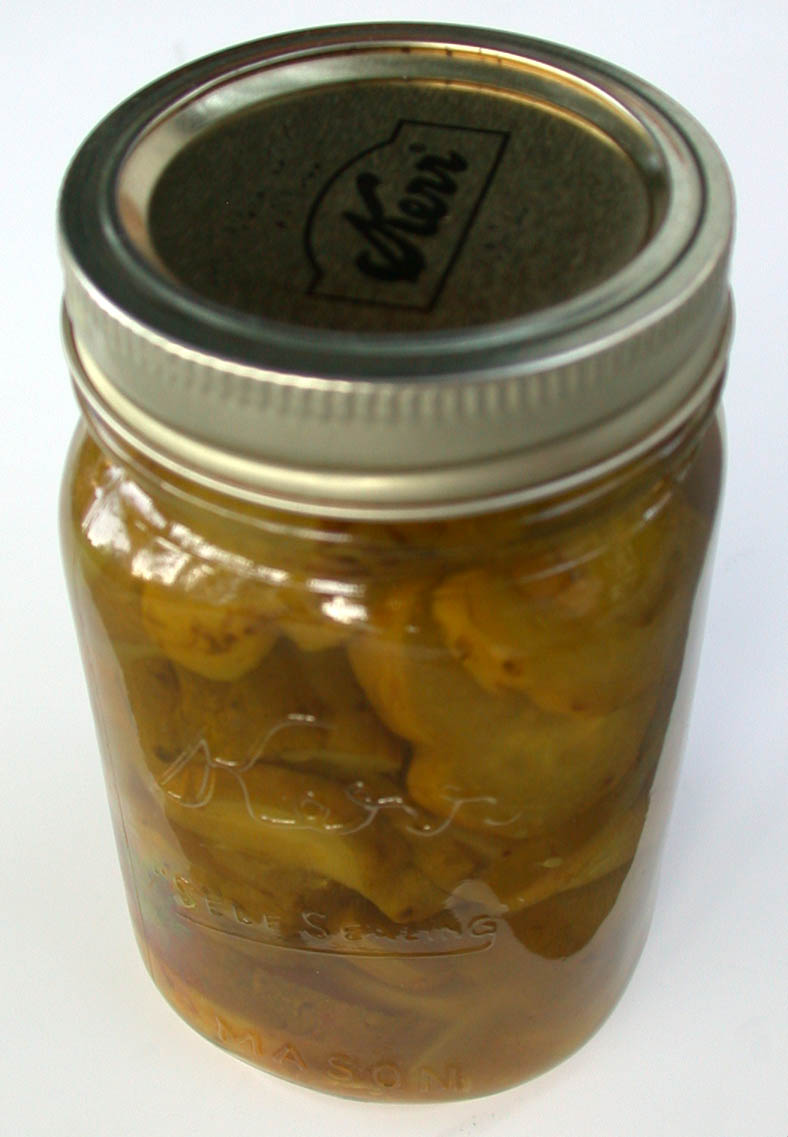
A jar of bread-and-butter pickles

Bread-and-butter pickles are a marinated variety of pickled cucumber in a solution of vinegar, sugar, and spices. They may be chilled as refrigerator pickles or canned. Their name and broad popularity in the United States are attributed to Omar and Cora Fanning, Illinois cucumber farmers who started selling sweet and sour pickles in the 1920s. They filed for the trademark "Fanning's Bread and Butter Pickles" in 1923 (though the recipe and similar recipes are probably much older). The story to the name is that the Fannings survived rough years by making the pickles with their surplus of undersized cucumbers and bartering them with their grocer for staples such as bread and butter. Their taste is often much sweeter than other types of pickle, due to the sweeter brine they are marinated in, but they differ from sweet pickles in that they are spiced with cilantro and other spices.

=== Gherkin ===
Gherkins are small cucumbers, typically those 3 to 13 cm (1 to 5 in) in length, often with bumpy skin, which are typically used for pickling. The word gherkin comes from early modern Dutch gurken or augurken, 'small pickled cucumber'.

Cornichons, or baby pickles, are tart French pickles made from gherkins pickled in vinegar and tarragon. They traditionally accompany pâtés and cold cuts. Sweet gherkins, which contain sugar in the pickling brine, are also a popular variety.

The term gherkin is also used in the name West Indian gherkin for Cucumis anguria, a closely related species. West Indian gherkins are also sometimes used as pickles.

=== Kosher dill ===
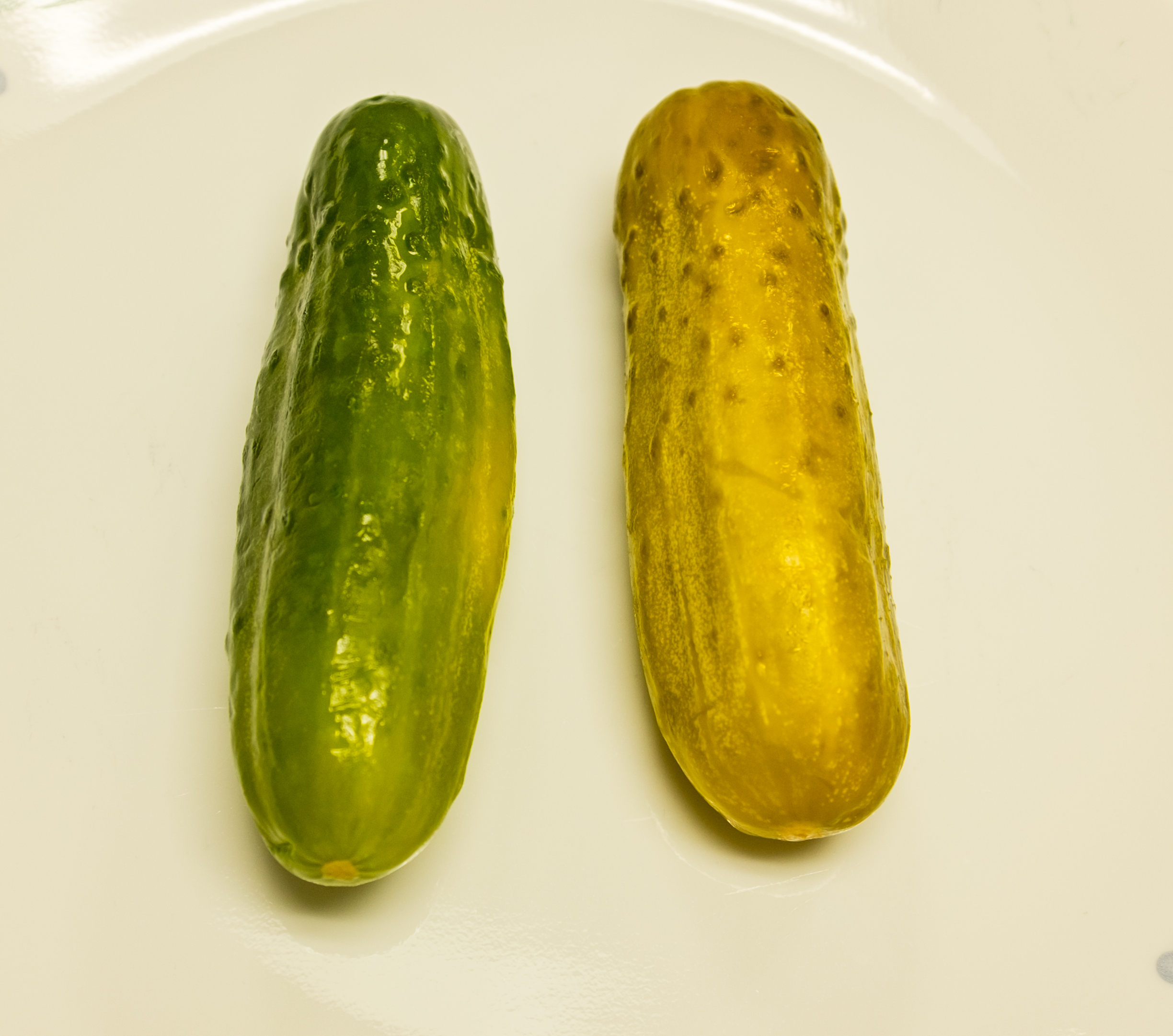
Half sour (left) vs "full sour" kosher dill (right)

A "kosher" dill pickle is not necessarily kosher in the sense that it has been prepared in accordance with Jewish dietary law. Instead, it is a pickle made in the traditional manner of Jewish New York City pickle makers, with a generous addition of garlic and dill to natural salt brine.

In New York terminology, a "full-sour" kosher dill is fully fermented, while a "half-sour", given a shorter stay in the brine, is still crisp and bright green.

Dill pickles, whether or not described as "kosher", have been served in New York City since at least 1899.

=== Hungarian ===
In Hungary, while regular vinegar-pickled cucumbers (Hungarian: savanyú uborka [ˈʃɒvɒɲuː ˈuborkɒ]) are made during most of the year, during the summer kovászos uborka ("leavened pickles") are made without the use of vinegar. Cucumbers are placed in a glass vessel along with spices (usually dill and garlic), water, and salt. Additionally, a slice or two of bread are placed at the top and bottom of the solution, and the container is left to sit in the sun for a few days so the yeast in the bread can help cause a fermentation process.

=== Polish and German ===
The Polish- or German-style pickled cucumber (Polish: ogórek kiszony [ɔˈɡurɛk kʲiˈʂɔnɨ] or ogórek kwaszony [ɔˈɡurɛk kfaˈʂɔnɨ]; German: Salzgurken [ˈzaltsɡʊʁkn̩]) was developed in the northern parts of central and eastern Europe. It has been exported worldwide and is found in the cuisines of many countries, including the United States, where immigrants introduced it. It is sour, similar to the kosher dill, but tends to be seasoned differently.

Traditionally, pickles were preserved in wooden barrels but are now sold in glass jars. A cucumber only pickled for a few days is different in taste (less sour) than one pickled for a longer time and is called ogórek małosolny, which means "low-salt cucumber". This distinction is similar to the one between half- and full-sour types of kosher dills (see above).

There are two types of cucumbers in Poland:

- Ogórek kiszony are pickled exclusively in a brine containing lactic acid bacteria (in salted water, without vinegar).
- Ogórek konserwowy (also called korniszon)(preserved cucumber) are pickled in a vinegar brine.

=== Lime ===
Lime pickles are soaked in pickling lime (not to be confused with the citrus fruit) rather than in a salt brine. This is done more to enhance texture (by making them crisper) rather than as a preservative. The lime is then rinsed off the pickles. Vinegar and sugar are often added after the 24-hour soak in lime, along with pickling spices. If the rinse is incomplete, the acids will end up too weak to preserve the vegetable, compromising food safety.

The crisping effect of lime is caused by its calcium content. A safer and more convenient alternative is calcium chloride, which is neutral and requires no rinsing.

=== Kool-Aid pickles ===
Kool-Aid pickles, or "koolickles", enjoyed by children in parts of the Southern United States, are created by soaking dill pickles in a mixture of powdered Kool-Aid and pickle brine. Southern Living reported that fruit punch and cherry Kool-Aid were the most popular flavors for pickling. The flesh of Kool-Aid pickles typically takes on a pink color. This dish inspired the creation of Kool-Aid pineapples.

== Nutrition ==
Similar to pickled vegetables such as sauerkraut, sour pickled cucumbers (technically a fruit) are low in calories. They also contain a moderate amount of vitamin K, specifically in the form of K_{1}. A 30-gram (1.1 oz) sour pickled cucumber offers 12–16 μg, or approximately 15–20% of the Recommended Daily Allowance, of vitamin K. It also offers 13 kJ (3 kcal) of food energy, most of which comes from carbohydrate. However, most sour pickled cucumbers are also high in sodium; one pickled cucumber can contain 350–500 mg, or 15–20% of the American recommended daily limit of 2400 mg.

Sweet pickled cucumbers, including bread-and-butter pickles, are higher in calories due to their sugar content; a similar 30-gram (1.1 oz) portion may contain 80 to 130 kJ (20 to 30 kcal). Sweet pickled cucumbers also tend to contain significantly less sodium than sour pickles.

Pickles are being researched for their ability to act as vegetables with high probiotic content. Probiotics are typically associated with dairy products, but lactobacilli species such as L. plantarum and L. brevis has been shown to add to the nutritional value of pickles.

== Serving ==
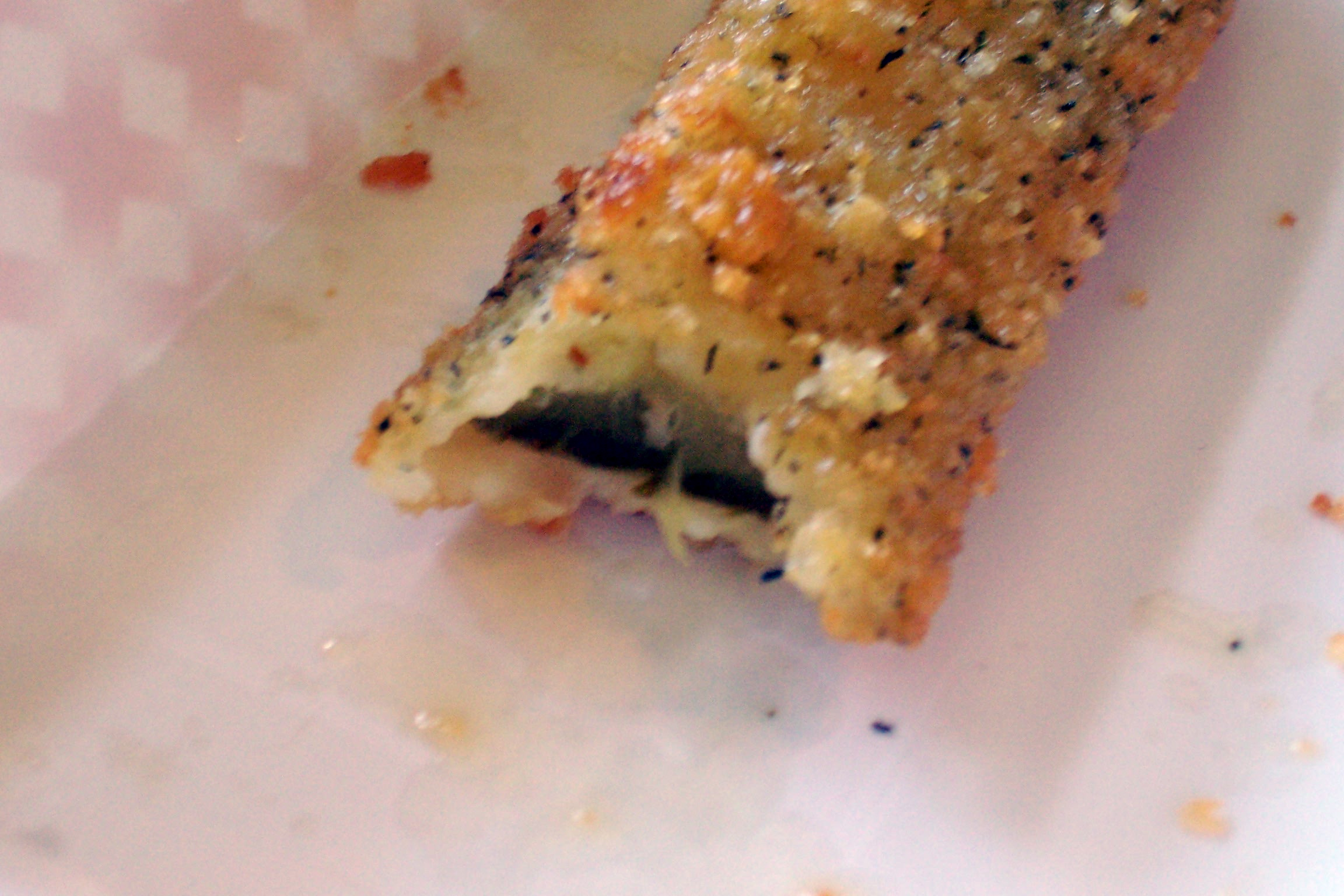
A breaded pickle

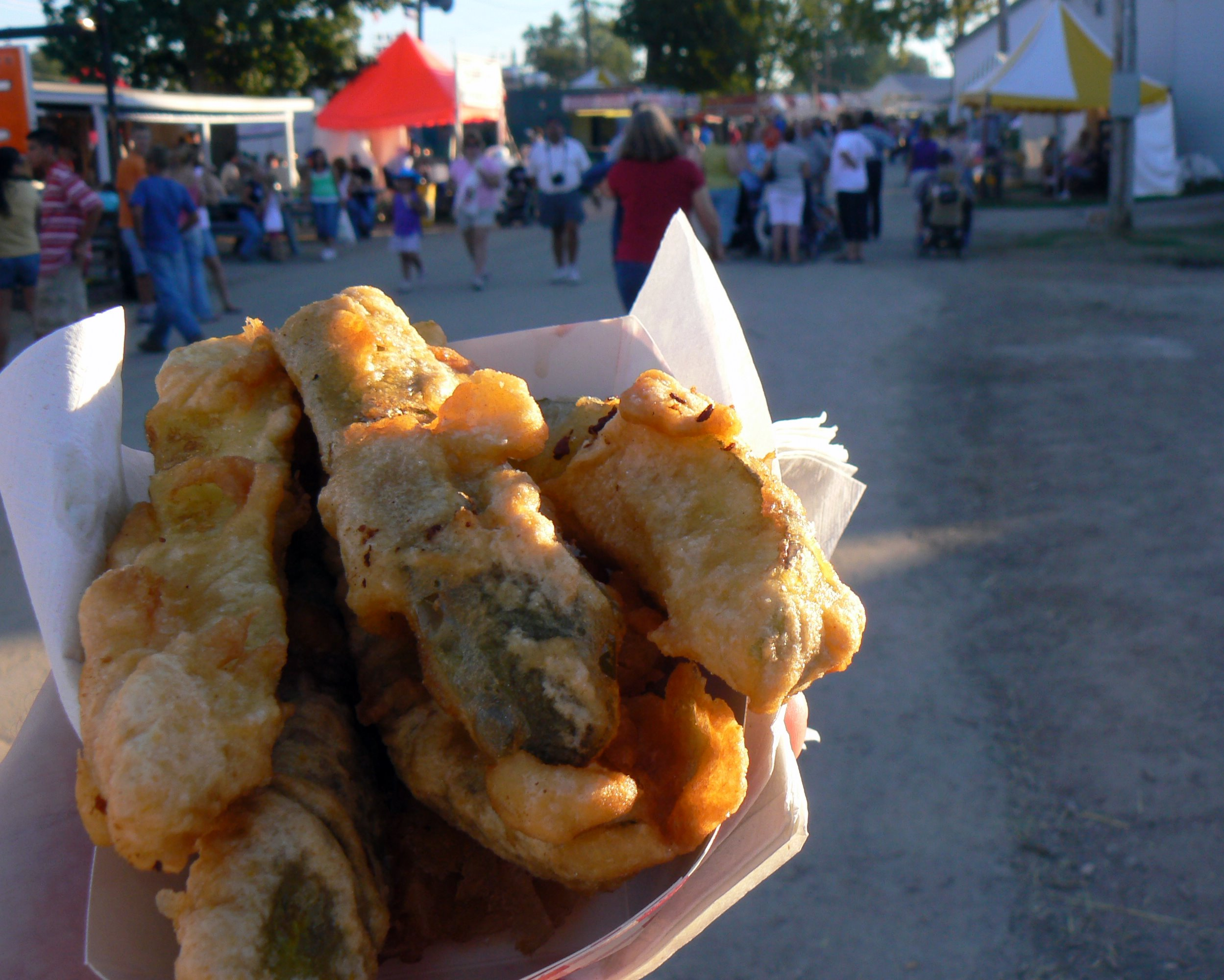
Fried pickles

During the Victorian era, pickles were considered a luxury food, meaning households that served pickles were wealthy enough to have servants or staff who could prepare pickles. Middle- and upper-class households often served pickles in pickle castors, a glass container in an embellished silver holder. The pickles were served with coordinated silver tongs.

In the United States, pickles are often served as a side dish accompanying meals. This usually takes the form of a "pickle spear", a pickled cucumber cut lengthwise into quarters or sixths. Pickles may be used as a condiment on a hamburger or other sandwich (usually in slice form) or a sausage or hot dog in chopped form as pickle relish. Pickles are an ingredient in Cuban sandwiches, along with ham, Swiss cheese, and mustard.

Soured cucumbers are commonly used in various dishes—for example, pickle-stuffed meatloaf, potato salad, or chicken salad—or consumed alone as an appetizer.

Pickles are sometimes served alone as festival foods, often on a stick. This is also done in Japan, where it is referred to as "stick pickle" (一本漬, ippon-tsuke).

Dill pickles can be fried, typically deep-fried with a breading or batter surrounding the spear or slice. This is a popular dish in the southern US and a rising trend elsewhere in the US.

In Russia and Ukraine, pickles are used in rassolnik: a traditional soup made from pickled cucumbers, pearl barley, pork or beef kidneys, and various herbs. The dish is known to have existed as far back as the 15th century when it was called kalya.

In southern England, large gherkins pickled in vinegar are served as an accompaniment to fish and chips and are sold from big jars on the counter at a fish and chip shop, along with pickled onions. In the Cockney dialect of London, this type of gherkin is called a "wally".

== Etymology ==
The term pickle is derived from the Dutch word pekel, meaning brine. In the United States and Canada, the word pickle alone used as a noun refers to a pickled cucumber (other types of pickled vegetables will be described using the adjective "pickled", such as "pickled onion", "pickled beets", etc.). In the UK pickle generally refers to a style of sweet, vinegary chutneys, such as Branston pickle, commonly served with a ploughman's lunch.

The term traditionally used in British English to refer to a pickled cucumber, gherkin, is also of Dutch origin, derived from the word gurken or augurken, meaning cucumber.

== Gallery ==
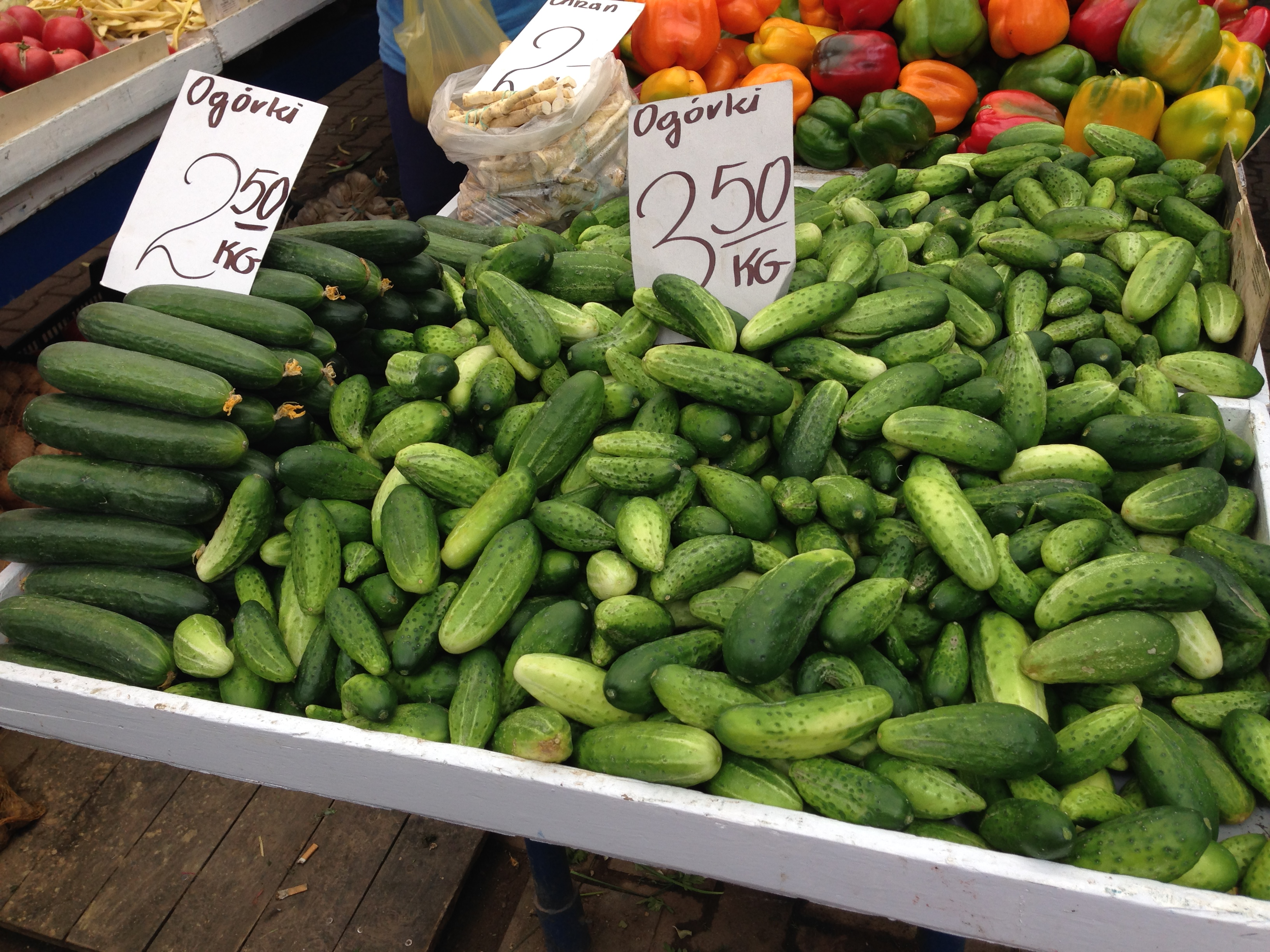
Fresh pickling cucumbers for sale in Kraków

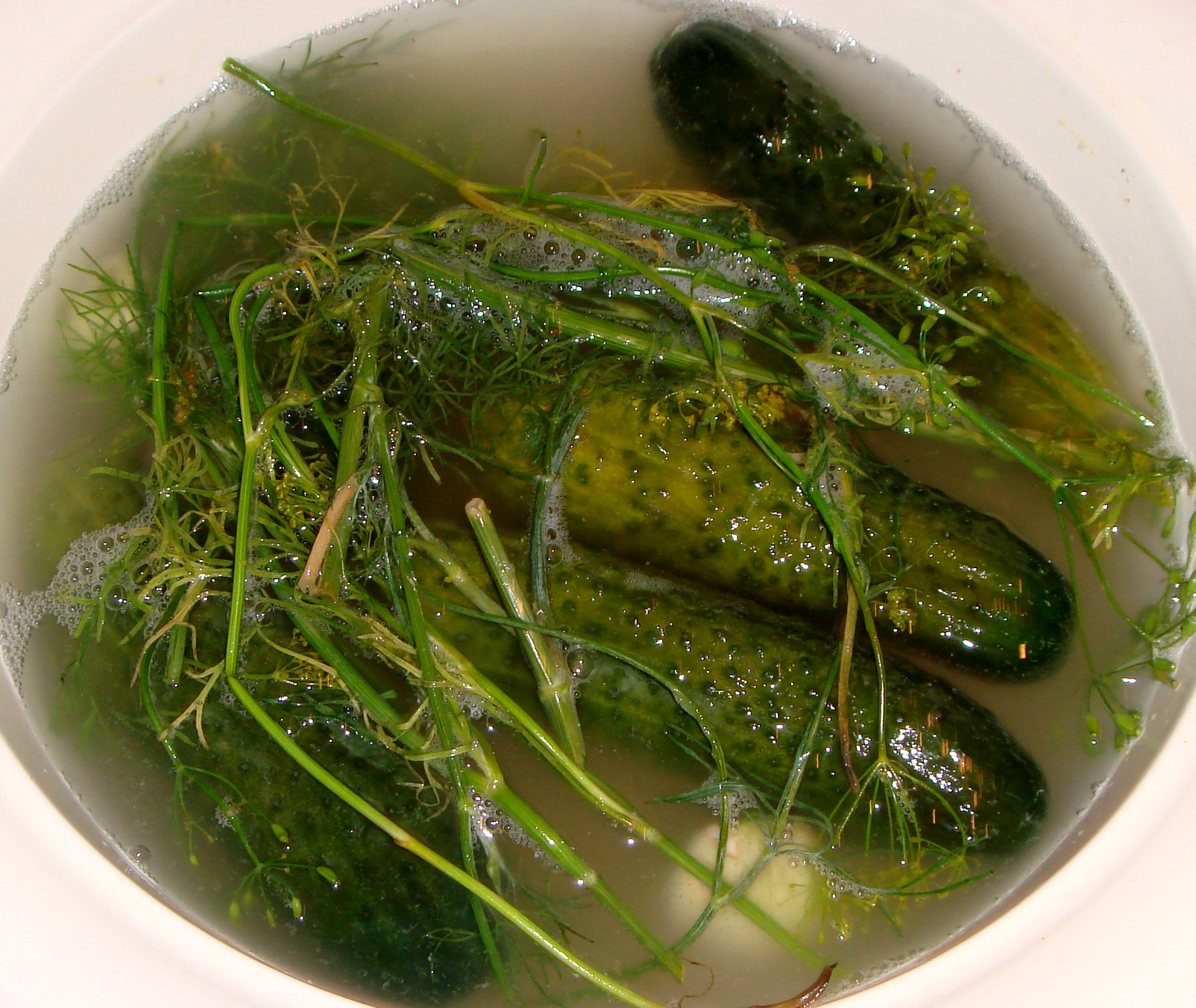
Cucumbers in salted water with dill (Poland)

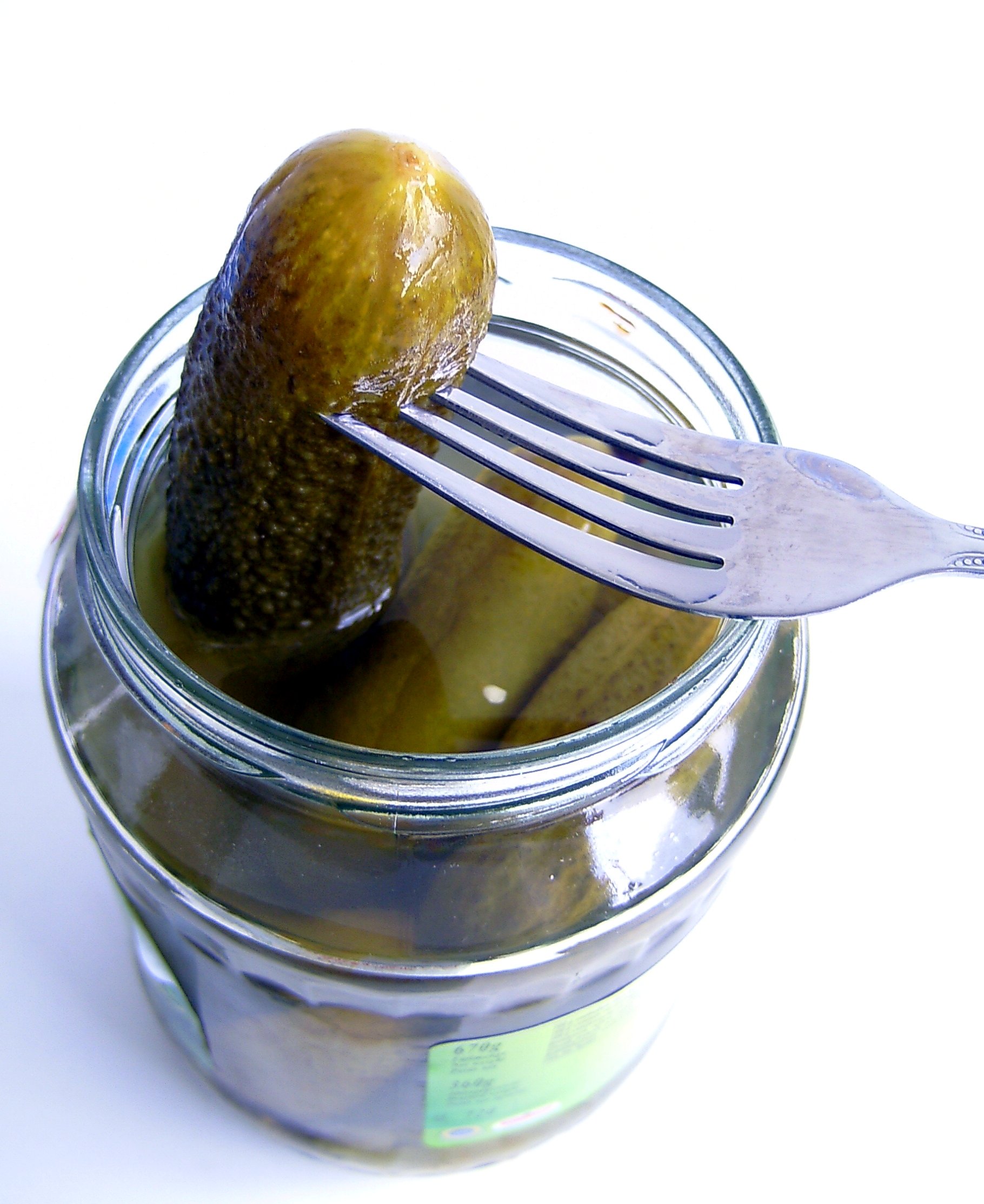
German pickles called Spreewald gherkins

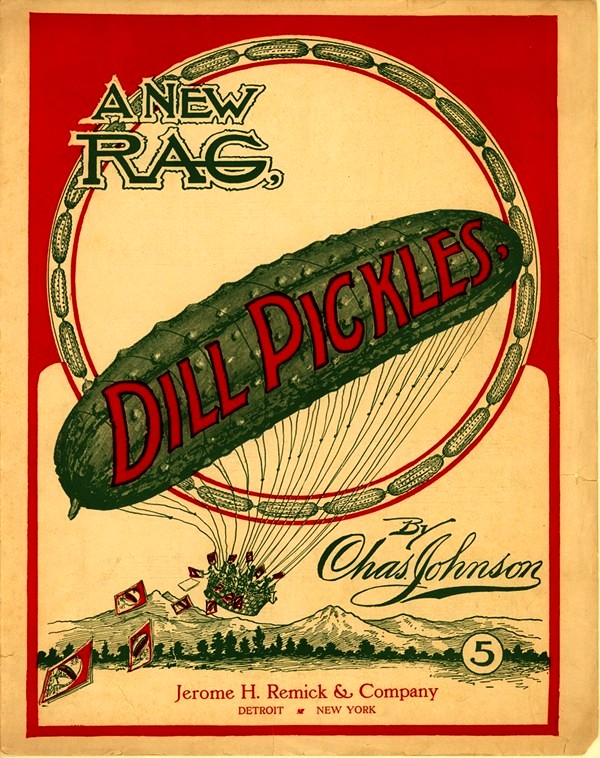
Cover for 1906 U.S. ragtime piece "Dill Pickles"

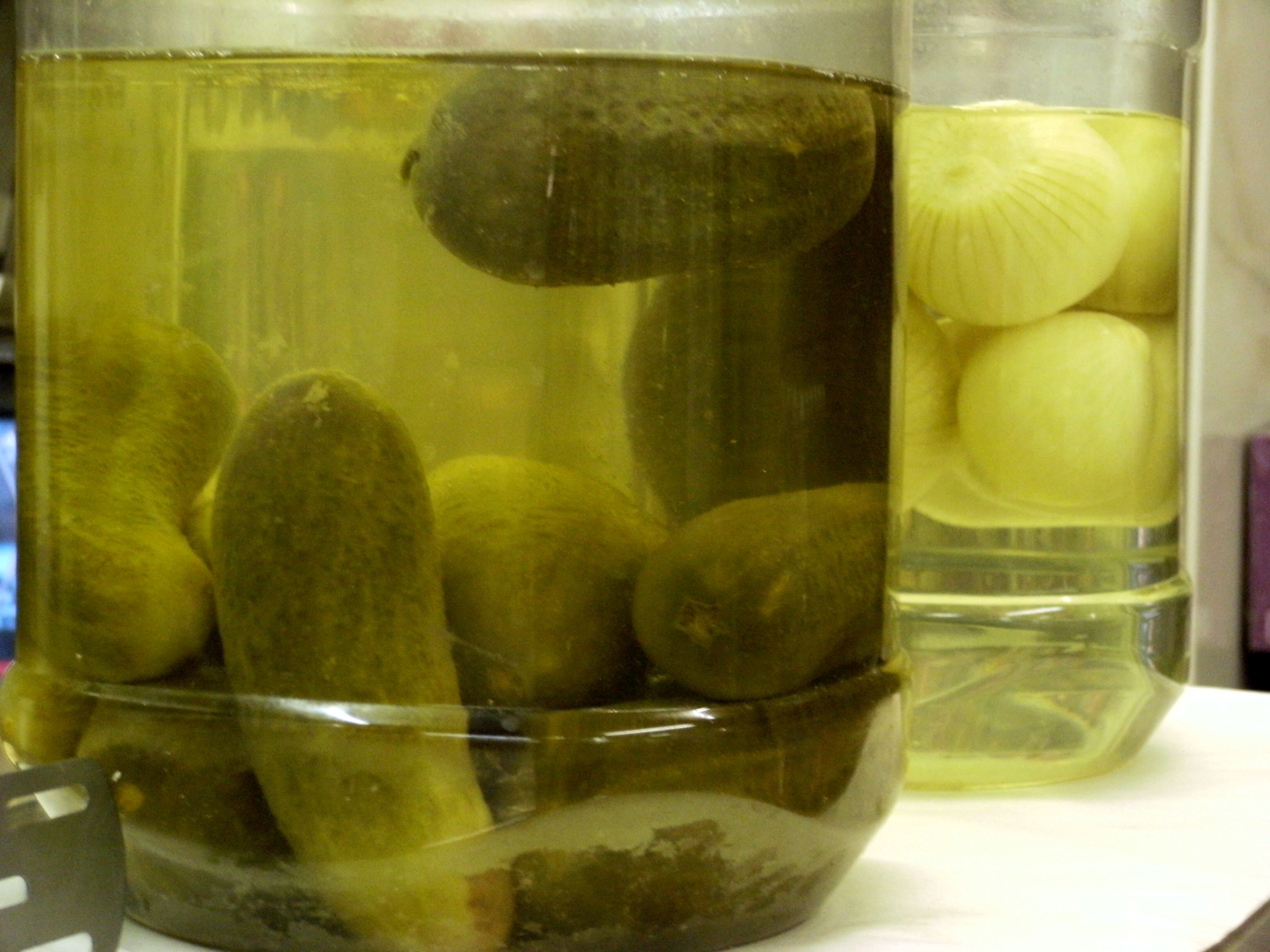
Large gherkins and pickled onions in a fish and chip shop in London

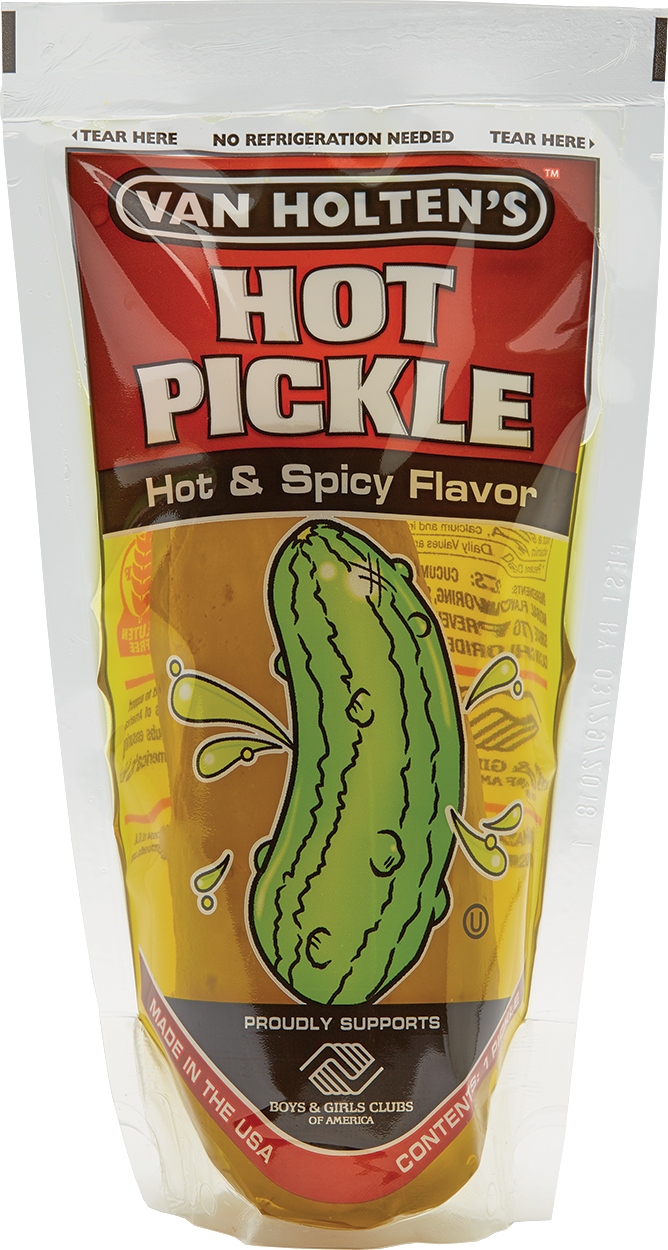
One pickle for individual sale, commonly found in convenience stores

== See also ==
- Glowing pickle demonstration – Scientific demo involving electrocution of pickles
- List of pickled foods
- Pickle soup – Soup prepared with pickled vegetables
- Pickle lifter – Device for lifting pickled goods from a container
- Picklesburgh – Annual pickle-themed festival in Pittsburgh
