= Lazy Dog Restaurant & Bar =

American casual dining restaurant chain

- Type: Private
- Industry: Restaurant
- Founded: Huntington Beach, CA (2003)
- Founder: Chris Simms, Gabe Caliendo, Steve Price, and Roshan Mendis
- Headquarters: Newport Beach, California, United States
- Number of locations: 51 restaurants (2026)
- Area served: United States (California, Colorado, Florida, Georgia, Illinois, Nevada, Texas, Virginia)
- Owner: Brentwood Associates
- Website: www.lazydogrestaurants.com

Lazy Dog Restaurant & Bar is an American casual dining restaurant chain. As of May 2026, Lazy Dog operates 51 restaurants across eight states: California, Florida, Nevada, Texas, Colorado, Illinois, Georgia, and Virginia; and there are plans to begin operations in Pennsylvania.

The restaurant's name was originally going to be Rocky Mountain Cafe. However, Lazy Dog Cafe received its unique name because Chris Simms, its founder, believed that the restaurant was "too serious" and wanted to make it more "kid-friendly". Chris Simms's father and partner in the business, Tom Simms, founded and later sold the popular restaurant chain Mimi's Cafe. The restaurant's seats have dog prints so that "kids would feel welcome".

A Lazy Dog outlet in Valencia, California.

In August 2003, a new restaurant was opened by Chris Simms in Westminster, California. It is decorated with photographs and drawings of hounds. The restaurant has an "eclectic" menu, including pizza and Kung Pao chicken.

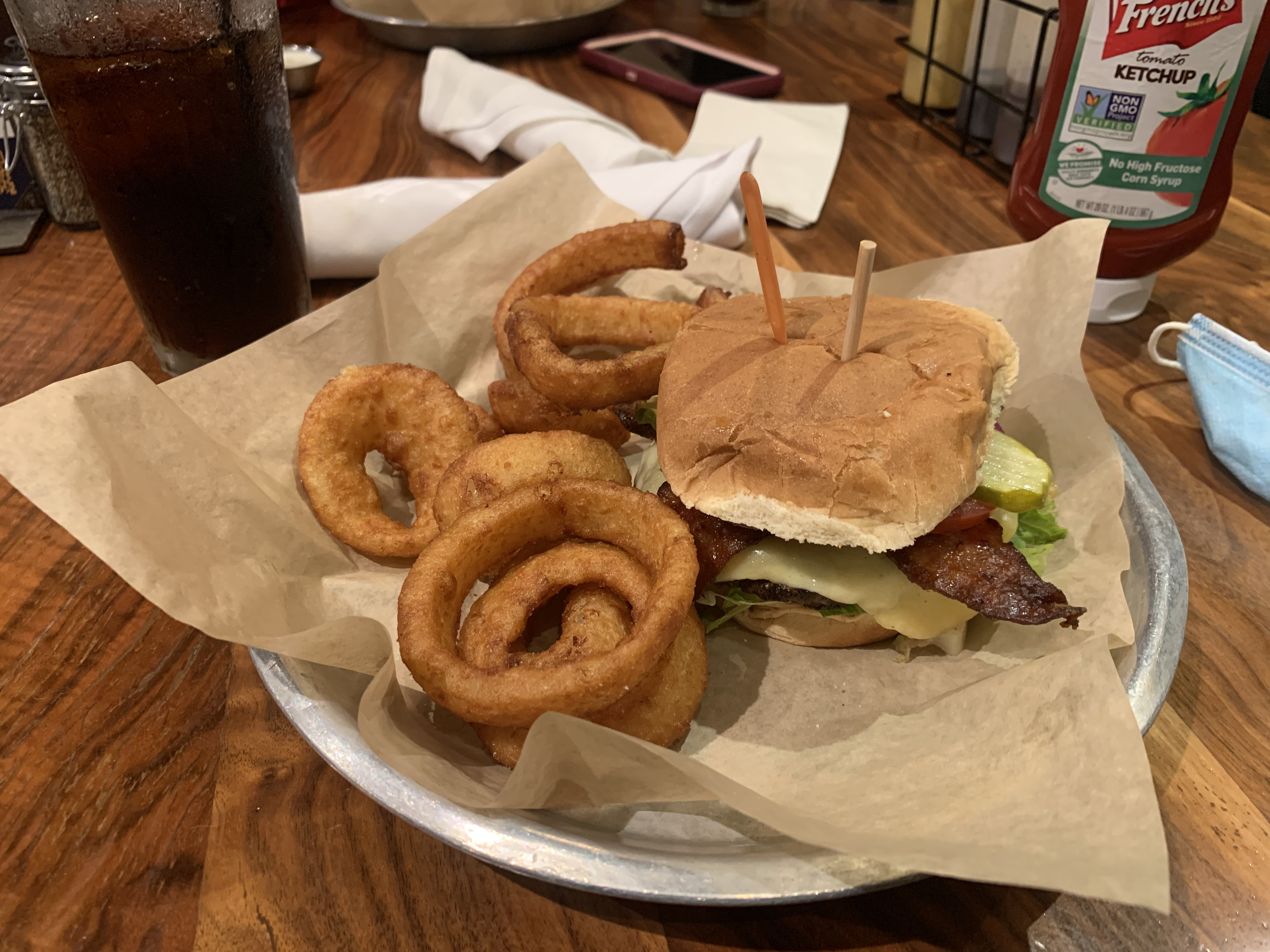
The PB & J Burger with onion rings on the side.

In July 2013, Brentwood Associates, a private equity buyout group purchased Lazy Dog at an undisclosed price. In a 2019 restaurant review, Daily Herald critic Jennifer Billock wrote, "On the whole, we had an excellent time at Lazy Dog. The atmosphere was comfortable, service was great, and we liked the food." In a 2017 restaurant review, Fort Worth Star-Telegram reviewer Robert Philpot said, "The extensive menu, more than anything else (well, more than anything besides the desserts), is what will get us to return: There's a lot to try here. The dog-friendliness of the patio makes the restaurant attractive to dog lovers, but it will be even more appealing if the restaurant and Euless can work things out so that the restaurant can serve a dog menu."
