= Brentwood Associates =

American private equity firm

- Company type: Private
- Industry: Private equity
- Founded: 1972; 54 years ago
- Founder: Frederick Warren, Timothy M. Pennington III, B. Kipling Hagopian
- Headquarters: Los Angeles, United States
- Products: Leveraged buyout, Venture capital
- Website: brentwood.com

Brentwood Associates is a private equity firm in the US with groups focusing on leveraged buyout.

The firm, which is based in Los Angeles, was founded in 1972. Their most recent fund was a $1.15bn fund raised in 2017. The venture capital group raised over $900 million across nine funds, the earliest of which was formed in 1980 and the last of which was raised in 1998, prior to the spinout of the firm's venture business.

== History ==
Brentwood was founded by Frederick Warren, Timothy M. Pennington III and B. Kipling Hagopian.

In 1999, the partners from Brentwood joined with partners from Institutional Venture Partners (IVP) and Crosspoint Ventures and created two separate industry-focused firms with the relevant firm making new investments in each of the respective industries:

- Redpoint Ventures, focusing on early stage information technology investments
- Versant Ventures, focused on health care venture investments

In 1999, Redpoint raised a $600 million venture fund Ventures I, at the time the largest first-time fund for a new firm.

== Investments ==
Since inception in 1972, Brentwood has invested in more than 50 companies across a wide array of industries. It has over $2 billion of assets under management and usually invests between $20 million and $200 million in each portfolio company. The firm's leveraged buyout practice has focused on acquiring more mature businesses, while its venture capital group has invested in earlier stage, startup companies.

=== Buyout investments ===
The firm's leveraged buyout practice has completed more than 50 investments. Among the most notable companies in which Brentwood has invested include: Ariat, Oriental Trading Company, Bell Sports, Bell Automotive, Prince Sports, C.C. Filson, Graphic Controls Corporation, The Teaching Company, Stanley Works, and Zumiez.

In 2007, Brentwood Associates bought a controlling stake in Zoës Kitchen. In April 2014, Zoës Kitchen's IPO offering raised $87.5 million.

In July 2013, Brentwood Associates acquired Lazy Dog Restaurant & Bar. In 2014, Brentwood acquired Marshall Retail Group in August and Z Gallerie in October.

In November 2019, Brentwood acquired the southern-style chicken salad chain, Chicken Salad Chick, for an undisclosed amount.

In 2021, Brentwood Associates recapitalized MedBridge, a healthcare SAAS platform.

=== Venture capital investments ===
Brentwood's venture group, prior to its spinout separation in 1999, was among the most prominent investment firms in the 1990s Internet boom. Among the firm's most notable investments in software and internet businesses during this period included: Wellfleet Communications, Xylan, Documentum, ISOCOR, WebTV Networks and Freegate. After 1999, investments in the internet and information technology sectors were made by Redpoint Ventures.

Brentwood also had a long history of investing in health care companies with strategically important products or services. Today, the vast majority of Brentwood's successful healthcare investments have been acquired by and integrated into larger healthcare companies including Baxter Healthcare and Medtronic. Among Brentwood's most notable investments included Keravision, Aradigm, Webster Laboratories and Interflo Medical.
