= Deputy (company) =

Australian software company

- Type: Private
- Industry: Workforce management software
- Founded: 2008
- Founder: Ashik Ahmed, Steve Shelley
- Headquarters: Sydney, Australia
- Area served: Worldwide
- Website: www.deputy.com

Deputy is an Australian workforce management software company founded in 2008 by Ashik Ahmed and Steve Shelley. The company develops scheduling and time-tracking software for workplaces that employ shift-based staff.

== History ==
Deputy was established in Sydney in 2008. Before founding the company, Ahmed had worked as CTO at an aviation services business operated by Shelley.

In 2017, Deputy raised US$25 million in a Series A funding round led by OpenView.

In 2018, the company raised AUD 111 million in a Series B round backed by IVP and OpenView. The investment was described by multiple publications as one of the largest Series B rounds for an Australian software company.

In 2023, Silvija Martincevic was appointed CEO, succeeding Ahmed.

In 2024, the Australian Financial Review and StartupDaily reported that Deputy had a valuation above USD 1 billion.

In November 2026, co-founders Ashik Ahmed and Steve Shelley returned to take over the role as interim co-CEOs, succeeding Martincevic.

== Products ==
Deputy's software includes employee scheduling and time and attendance features, along with integrations with payroll platforms such as Xero, MYOB, QuickBooks and ADP.

In 2025, the company introduced a payroll product for shift-based businesses, as reported by Retail World Magazine.

The company also publishes reports on employment and workplace trends.

== Reception ==
Deputy has been the subject of reporting in business and technology publications, including the Australian Financial Review, TechCrunch, StartupDaily, CRN Australia and Forbes Australia, which have covered its funding rounds, leadership changes, and valuation reports.

== See also ==
- Employee scheduling software
- Workforce management
- Software as a service
