= Michael Lazerow =

American journalist

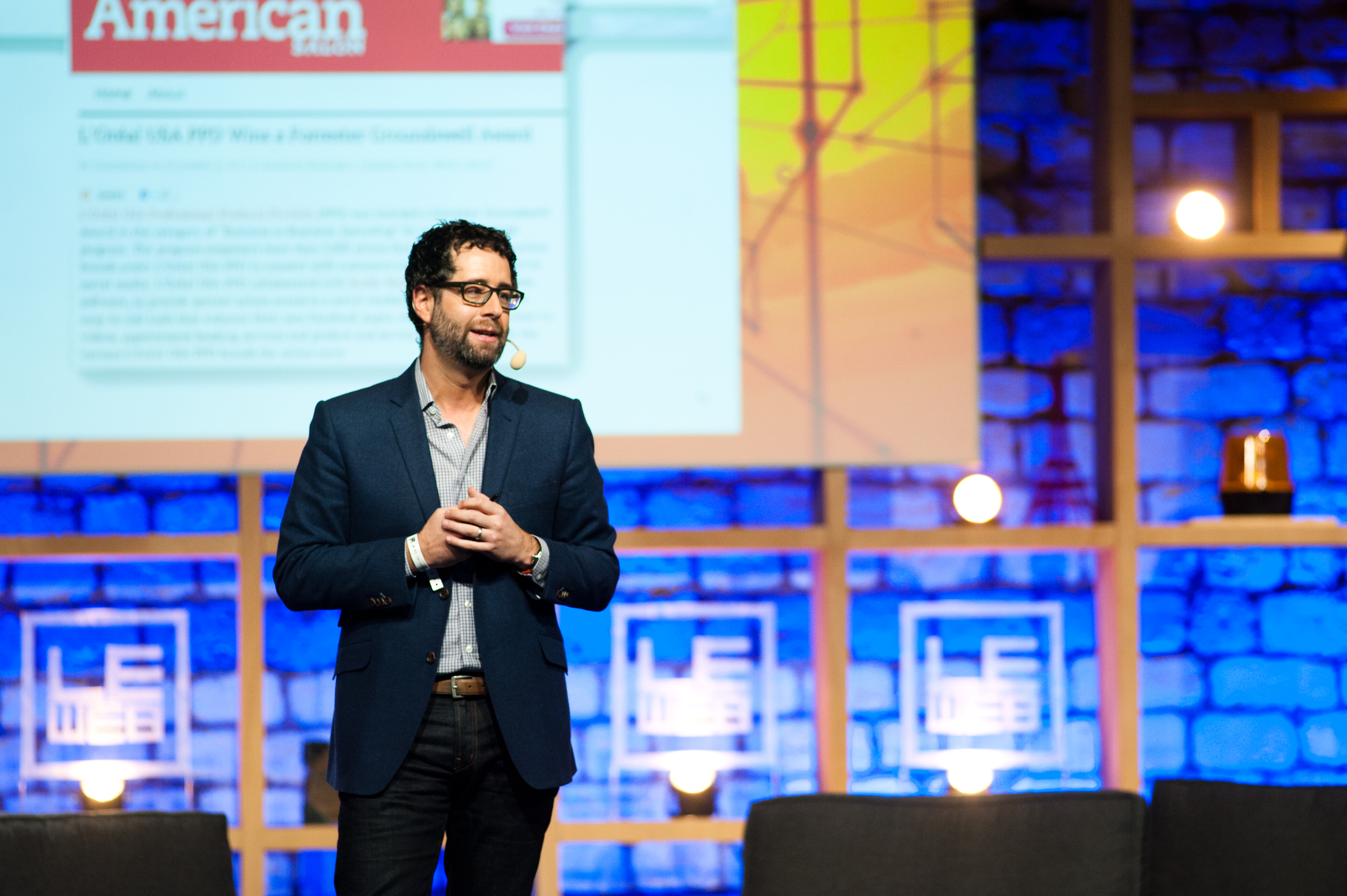
Michael Lazerow at LeWeb in 2011

Michael Lazerow is a New York City-based bestselling author, entrepreneur and venture capitalist.

He has founded several software companies, including Buddy Media, Inc. and University Wire.

== Career ==
Lazerow graduated in 1996 with a B.S. and M.S. in journalism from Northwestern University, where he is still active as a member of the university's Medill School Board of Advisers.

While attending Northwestern University, Lazerow founded University Wire (now owned by Columbia Broadcasting System (CBS)), a network of more than 700 student-run newspapers. He later founded GOLF.com, which was purchased by Time Warner's Time Inc. division in 2006. Subsequent to the 2006 acquisition, Lazerow joined Time Inc. as General Manager of GOLF.com and GOLFONLINE.com.

In 2007, Lazerow co-founded Buddy Media, Inc., a privately held company that sells social media marketing software. Lazerow was chairman and CEO before the company was sold to Salesforce.com on June 4, 2012, for $745 million.

In 2019, Lazerow co-founded Velvet Sea Ventures, a multi-stage venture capital firm. The firm has invested in Scopely and Liquid Death. Lazerow was also a seed investor in Scopely, which announced on April 5, 2023, that it had signed an agreement to sell for $4.9 billion to Savvy Games. In 2024, Velvet Sea Ventures invested in semiconductor company Etched's Series A financing. Two years later the company was valued at $21 billion.

In September 2022, Lazerow and his wife, Kass, endowed The Mary Dedinsky Graduate Journalism Scholarship to honor Mary Dedinsky's long-time work at Medill and the broader journalism profession. Mary was the first woman to be named managing editor of a major metropolitan newspaper. She is a member of the Chicago Journalism Hall of Fame and twice w as a Pulitzer Prize juror. Mary also w as Lazerow's academic adviser at Northwestern.

== Personal life ==
Lazerow lives in New York City with his wife, Kass, who was Buddy Media's COO. They have three children, Myles, Cole and Vivian.

Lazerow and Kass co-write the New York Times, USA TODAY and LA Times bestseller, Shoveling $h!t: A Love Story About the Entrepreneur’s Messy Path to Success, about their hard-learned lessons from decades of shoveling as cofounders and early investors in startups.

Lazerow has a heart condition called a ventricular septal defect that resulted in an emergency aortic valve replacement in 1994. His YouTube video "A New Beginning - Is Fear Holding You Back?" about the condition, posted after the sale of Buddy Media to Salesforce, has received more than 150,000 views.

Lazerow is a long-time fan of Phish and has attended more than 150 Phish shows.

== Works ==
- Lazerow, Kass; Lazerow, Michael (2025-06-03). Shoveling $h!t: a Love Story about the Entrepreneur's Messy Path to Success. Amplify Publishing. ISBN 979-8-89138-351-7.
