= List of venture capital firms =

Below is a list of notable venture capital firms:

== Assets under management ==
Shown below are the largest venture capital firms ranked by Assets Under Management as of 2026.

Rank	Firm	Headquarters	Assets under management
1	(United States) Andreessen Horowitz	Menlo Park, CA	$90.0B
2	(United States) Insight Partners	New York City, NY	$90.0B
3	Sequoia Capital	Menlo Park, CA	$56.0B
4	(United States) General Catalyst	Cambridge, MA	$43.0B
5	(United States) Lightspeed Venture Partners	Menlo Park, CA	$40.0B
6	(United States) Thrive Capital	New York City, NY	$36.8B
7	(Europe) Index Ventures	London	$35.0B
8	(United States) New Enterprise Associates	Chevy Chase, MD	$28.0B
9	(United States) Accel	Palo Alto, CA	$20.0B
10	(United States) Khosla Ventures	Menlo Park, CA	$17.0B

== Capital raised ==
Data is for capital raised between January 1, 2019, and December 31, 2023. Data is from Venture Capital Journal in 2024.

Rank	Firm	Headquarters	Capital raised ($bn)
1	(United States) Andreessen Horowitz	Menlo Park, CA	17.41
2	(United States) General Catalyst Partners	Cambridge, MA	8.21
3	(United States) Bessemer Venture Partners	Menlo Park, CA	7.87
4	(China) Qiming Venture Partners	Shanghai	6.90
5	(United States) New Enterprise Associates	Menlo Park, CA	6.80
6	(United States) ARCH Venture Partners	Chicago, IL	6.38
7	(United States) Index Ventures	San Francisco, CA	5.40
8	(United States) Flagship Pioneering	Cambridge, MA	5.29
9	(United States) B Capital	Manhattan Beach, CA	5.19
10	(United States) Sapphire Ventures	Menlo Park, CA	4.87

== Deal flow ==
Shown below are the largest venture capital firms by deal flow in 2025.

Rank	Firm	Headquarters	Number of Deals
1	(Singapore) Antler	Singapore	433
2	(United States) Y Combinator	Mountain View, CA	353
3	(United States) Gaingels	Burlington, VT	348
4	(United States) Plug and Play Tech Center	Sunnyvale, CA	297
5	(United States) Alumni Ventures	Manchester, NH	286
6	(United States) Transpose Platform Management	San Francisco, CA	283
7	(United States) Andreessen Horowitz	Menlo Park, CA	277
8	(Republic of Ireland) Enterprise Ireland	Dublin	275
9	(United States) General Catalyst	Cambridge, MA	227
10	(United States) Pioneer Fund	New York City, NY	188

== List ==
=== Americas ===
- (United States) 1789 Capital
- (United States) 500 Global
- (United States) 8VC
- (United States) Accel
- (United States) Addition
- (United States) Advanced Technology Ventures
- (United States) Almaz Capital
- (United States) Alumni Ventures
- (United States) Andreessen Horowitz
- (United States) ARCH Venture Partners
- (United States) Atlas Venture
- (United States) August Capital
- (United States) Austin Ventures
- (United States) B Capital
- (United States) Bain Capital Ventures
- (United States) Baseline Ventures
- (United States) Battery Ventures
- (United States) Benchmark Capital
- (United States) Bessemer Venture Partners
- (United States) Binary Capital
- (United States) Bloomberg Beta
- (United States) Blumberg Capital
- (United States) Bonfire Ventures
- (United States) BoxGroup
- (United States) Canaan Partners
- (United States) CapitalG
- (United States) Charles River Ventures
- (United States) Collaborative Fund
- (United States) Columbus Nova
- (United States) Comcast Ventures
- (United States) Contrary
- (United States) Cottonwood Technology Fund
- (United States) Council Capital
- (United States) Craft Ventures
- (United States) Crosslink Capital
- (United States) CrunchFund
- (United States) CSA Partners
- (United States) DAG Ventures
- (United States) DCM Ventures
- (United States) Draper Fisher Jurvetson
- (United States) Drive Capital
- (United States) Elevate Capital
- (United States) Felicis
- (United States) Fifth Wall
- (United States) First Round Capital
- (United States) FirstMark Capital
- (United States) Flagship Pioneering
- (United States) Floodgate Fund
- (United States) Forerunner Ventures
- (United States) Foresite Capital
- (United States) Foundation Capital
- (United States) Founder Collective
- (United States) Founders Fund
- (United States) Freestyle Capital
- (United States) Gaingels
- (United States) General Catalyst
- (United States) GE Ventures
- (United States) Greycroft
- (United States) Greylock Partners
- (Canada) Growthworks
- (United States) GSR Ventures
- (United States) GV
- (United States) Headline
- (United States) Highland Capital Partners
- (United States) Hustle Fund
- (United States) IDG Ventures
- (United States) Index Ventures
- (United States) Initialized Capital
- (United States) In-Q-Tel
- (United States) Insight Partners
- (United States) Institutional Venture Partners
- (United States) Intel Capital
- (United States) Intellectual Ventures
- (United States) Keiretsu Forum
- (United States) Khosla Ventures
- (United States) Kleiner Perkins
- (United States) Left Lane Capital
- (United States) Lightbank
- (United States) Lighter Capital
- (United States) Lightspeed Venture Partners
- (United States) Liquid 2 Ventures
- (United States) Lux Capital
- (United States) M12
- (United States) Madrona Venture Group
- (United States) Matrix Partners
- (United States) Maveron
- (United States) Mayfield
- (United States) Meritech Capital Partners
- (United States) Mithril Capital
- (United States) New Enterprise Associates
- (United States) Norwest Venture Partners
- (United States) Oak Investment Partners
- (United States) OpenAI Startup Fund
- (United States) Oregon Venture Fund
- (United States) Paradigm Operations
- (United States) Pear VC
- (United States) Playground Global
- (United States) Plug and Play Tech Center
- (United States) Polaris Partners
- (United States) TechOperators
- (United States) Preston-Werner Ventures
- (United States) Qualcomm Ventures
- (United States) Redpoint Ventures
- (United States) Revolution LLC
- (United States) Ribbit Capital
- (United States) Rothenberg Ventures
- (United States) RRE Ventures
- (United States) Sapphire Ventures
- (United States) Scale Venture Partners
- (United States) Sequoia Capital
- (United States) Sevin Rosen Funds
- (United States) Shasta Ventures
- (United States) Social Capital
- (United States) SoftTech VC
- (United States) SOSV
- (United States) South Park Commons
- (United States) Spark Capital
- (United States) Sutter Hill Ventures
- (United States) SV Angel
- (United States) TCV
- (United States) Tenaya Capital
- (United States) Third Rock Ventures
- (United States) Thrive Capital
- (United States) Tiger Global Management
- (United States) Tribe Capital
- (United States) U.S. Venture Partners
- (United States) Union Square Ventures
- (United States) Unusual Ventures
- (United States) Upfront Ventures
- (United States) Valar Ventures
- (United States) Venrock
- (United States) Versant Ventures
- (United States) Vivo Capital
- (United States) Walden International
- (United States) Wing Venture Capital
- (United States) Wisconsin Investment Partners
- (United States) Xfund
- (United States) Y Combinator

=== EMEA ===
- (United Kingdom) Abingworth
- (Germany) Acton Capital
- (United Kingdom) Atomico Ventures
- (United Kingdom) Balderton Capital
- (United Kingdom) BGF
- (Netherlands) Cottonwood Technology Fund
- (Czech Republic) KAYA VC
- (Czech Republic) Credo Ventures
- (United Kingdom) DN Capital
- (United Kingdom) Draper Esprit
- (Sweden) EQT Ventures
- (Israel) Genesis Partners
- (Germany) German Startups Group
- (Switzerland) HBM Healthcare Investments
- (Sweden) HealthCap
- (Germany) High-Tech Gründerfonds
- (United Kingdom) Impact X
- (Israel) Infinity Group
- (Russia) IIDF
- (France) Iris Capital
- (Israel) Jerusalem Venture Partners
- (United Kingdom) Mercia Fund Management
- (France) Newfund
- (United Kingdom) Nova Founders Capital
- (United Kingdom) Oxford Science Enterprises
- (Israel) Pitango
- (United Kingdom) Playfair Capital
- (Emirate of Dubai) Porton Group
- (United Kingdom) Seedcamp
- (United Kingdom) Seraphim Space
- (United Kingdom) SoftBank Vision Fund
- (United Kingdom) SyndicateRoom
- (Switzerland) TBG AG
- (Germany) Wellington Partners Venture Capital

=== Asia ===
- (China) 5Y Capital
- (China) Addor Capital
- (Singapore) Antler
- (Singapore) BANSEA
- (China) CAS Star
- China State-owned Asset Venture Capital Investment Fund
- (India) Chiratae Ventures
- (China) CoStone Capital
- (China) Cowin Capital
- (Hong Kong) DST Global
- (China) Eastern Bell Capital
- (China) Fortune Venture Capital
- (China) Gaorong Capital
- (Malaysia) Gobi Partners
- (Singapore) Golden Gate Ventures
- (Singapore) Granite Asia
- (Hong Kong) HongShan
- (China) IDG Capital
- (Japan) JAFCO
- (Japan) JIC Venture Growth Investments
- (China) K2VC
- (China) Lanchi Ventures
- (China) MiraclePlus
- (China) MPCi
- (China) Northern Light Venture Capital
- (China) Oriental Fortune Capital
- (China) Oriza Holdings
- (China) Plum Ventures
- (China) Qiming Venture Partners
- (Singapore) Quest Ventures
- (China) Shanghai Venture Capital Co.
- (China) Shenzhen Capital Group
- (China) Shenzhen HTI Group
- (China) Shunwei Capital
- (China) Sinovation Ventures
- (China) Source Code Capital
- (South Korea) STIC Investments
- (China) Tiantu Capital
- (India) Unitus Ventures
- (Singapore) Vertex Holdings
- (China) ZhenFund
- (Hong Kong) ZWC Partners

== See also ==
- Angel investor
- Comparison of crowdfunding services
- List of asset management firms
- List of hedge funds
- List of private equity firms
