= Eastern Bell Capital =

Chinese venture capital firm

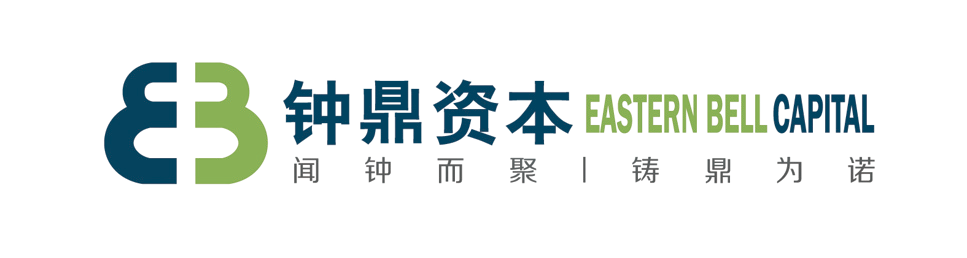
- Native name: 钟鼎资本
- Type: Private
- Industry: Venture capital
- Founded: 2010; 16 years ago
- Founders: Li Yan; Mei Zhiming; Tao Tang
- Headquarters: Shanghai, China
- AUM: US$4 billion (2024)
- Website: www.ebcapital.com.cn

Eastern Bell Capital (Eastern Bell; Chinese: 钟鼎资本; pinyin: Zhōngdǐng Zīběn) is a Chinese venture capital (VC) firm that is headquartered in Shanghai. It focuses on early and growth stage investments in the supply chain and logistics sector.

== Background ==
Eastern Bell was founded by Li Yan, Mei Zhiming, and Tao Tang. Li is the founder of the family office Black Spade and Mei is the co-founder and CEO of GLP. Oriza Holdings provided initial funding to the firm.

Eastern Bell started investing in early-stage companies, but as the funds got larger, more resources were allocated to growth-stage companies.

By 2014, Eastern Bell had studied each segment of the U.S. logistics industry and the driving forces behind it. It found that China's development was similar but there was a 25-year gap. The biggest issue was the lack of centralization regarding China' logistics network, so it looked for opportunities regarding it.

In June 2017, it was reported there was potential conflict of interest issues with GLP investing in companies that were already funded by Eastern Bell due to Mei's role as GLP's CEO and Eastern Bell's co-founder. However, GLP stated there were no issues as such deals did not require approval of GLP's board since the deal sizes were below the reporting threshold. Mei recused himself on any GLP decisions involving Eastern Bell portfolio companies. Such companies both entities invested in include FOR-U Smart Freight and China Eastern Airlines

In November 2019, Eastern Bell raised $365 million for the Eastern Bell Capital Fund I, its first USD-denominated fund.

In April 2021, Eastern Bell spun-out its venture capital unit including co-founder Tao to form a separate entity named Starlight Capital. Eastern Bell's venture capital funds would be investors in Starlight Capital funds.

In 2021 the Ministry of Industry and Information Technology launched a regulatory campaign on Chinese technology companies leading to investors to pause or rethink their exposure to Chinese investments and halt fundraising. However Eastern Bell during this period managed to double its assets under management by raising $2 billion in December 2021.

== See also ==
- GLP
