= BoldVoice =

Mobile app

- Developer: BoldVoice
- Release: 2021; 5 years ago
- Operating system: iOS, Android
- Type: Language learning
- License: Proprietary, subscription

BoldVoice is an American mobile application for accent and English pronunciation coaching, aimed at non-native English speakers. The app combines short video lessons taught by professional accent coaches with automatic speech recognition technology that gives users feedback on their pronunciation.

== History ==
BoldVoice was founded in 2021 by Anada Lakra and Ilya Usorov, and is based in New York City. Lakra, who moved to the United States from Albania to attend Yale University, and Usorov, whose immigrant parents faced workplace communication barriers, developed the app to help non-native speakers improve spoken English. The company took part in Y Combinator's Summer 2021 batch and raised an initial pre-seed round of about $605,000. In 2022 it raised $2.2 million in seed funding from investors including Flybridge Capital Partners, Xfund, Liquid 2 Ventures and Y Combinator.

In January 2026, BoldVoice raised a $21 million Series A round led by Matrix Partners, bringing its total funding to $27.1 million. At the time the company reported more than five million downloads, users in over 150 countries, and annual recurring revenue exceeding $10 million.

== Product ==
The app is available on iOS and Android and offers structured lessons and exercises in which users pronounce individual sounds, words, phrases or sentences and receive instant AI-generated feedback identifying aspects of pronunciation that need improvement. Instruction is organized around what the company calls the "three Ps": posture, phonology and porosity. It uses custom speech models to give phoneme-level feedback, analyzing individual sounds in a user's speech and recommending targeted drills, and later versions added real-time analysis and AI role-play practice scenarios.

== Academic evaluation ==
BoldVoice has been the subject of several academic reviews and studies in language-education journals. A media review in Language Learning & Technology described it as a learner-centered, ASR-based application offering personalized, self-paced pronunciation training with progress tracking. A quantitative pre-experimental study of Indonesian secondary-school students published in the Journal of English Language and Education reported that use of the app produced improvement in pronunciation, with mean test scores rising from 66.5 to 74.8. A qualitative study in Lembaran Ilmu Kependidikan found that students perceived the app positively for improving pronunciation, intonation and speaking confidence.

== Reception ==
BoldVoice received early recognition from the Google Play Store, which named it one of its "Best Hidden Gems" of 2021. By 2026, trade and financial press reported that the app had surpassed five million downloads and was used by professionals in more than 150 countries. Its rapid growth on a small team was noted as an example of an "AI-native" consumer application.

BoldVoice has also drawn commentary in the wider debate over AI-based accent reduction. A 2026 article in Wired discussed such tools in the context of questions about cultural assimilation and the pressure on non-native speakers to alter how they sound.
