= HBM =

HBM may refer to:

== Science and technology ==
- HBM (gene), a human gene
- High Bandwidth Memory, a computer memory standard
- Health belief model
- Hierarchical Bayes model
- Human-body model (HBM) in the realm of electrostatic discharge

== Other uses ==
- Havelock-Belmont-Methuen, a township in Peterborough County, Ontario, Canada
- HBM Healthcare Investments, a Swiss venture capital and investment firm
- His or Her Britannic Majesty
- Hitman: Blood Money, a video game
- Hudbay, a Canadian mining company
- Hummingbird Medal, a state decoration of Trinidad and Tobago
- Habitation à bon marché, the predecessor of the French HLM housing program
