= BoardVitals =

Medical board certification

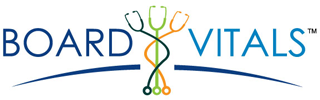
- Type: Private
- Industry: Medical Education
- Founded: 2012; 14 years ago
- Founder: Andrea Paul, Dan Lambert
- Headquarters: New York City
- Services: Test preparation and review
- Website: https://www.boardvitals.com/

BoardVitals is a firm based in New York City that provides preparation materials for medical board certification exams, founded in 2012. The company offers study materials, question banks, and practice exams for physicians, medical students, and other healthcare professionals.

In 2014, BoardVitals won the CATAPULT NYC competition for start-ups.

== Founding ==
BoardVitals was founded by Andrea Paul and Dan Lambert in 2012. Paul, a graduate of Michigan State medical school and former resident at Yale medical school and Mt. Sinai Hospital, was motivated to start the company due to her own experiences with disorganized study materials while preparing for medical board exams. In an interview with Entrepreneur Magazine, she recalled that she “was preparing for boards, and was putting together things from other books and notes that were not up to date.” Paul identified a lack of standardized preparation materials and sought to create a more effective solution. Dr. Paul left her Yale residency program to collaborate with medical educators.

She partnered with Harvard Business School graduate and software developer Dan Lambert in 2012 to lead BoardVitals as its CEO. Lambert was formerly a co-founder and CTO at Pushpins, which was acquired by Ebates in 2013.

== Business structure ==
After its founding in 2012, BoardVitals has undergone several rounds of financing. In January 2014, it received a $500,000 seed investment from venture capital firms Rothenberg Ventures and Accelerator Blueprint Health.

In February 2014, BoardVitals entered the Gust Catapult NYC startup contest sponsored by entrepreneur and investor David S. Rose. The company was selected as the winner from over 200 entries and was invited to spend three months in a Silicon Alley incubator under Rose's tutelage. This led to the company drawing attention from several major investment groups.

BoardVitals' client list includes Harvard Medical School, Yale Medical School, and the Veterans Health Administration. The company has also partnered with medical publishers such as McGraw-Hill, Wolters Kluwer Health, and Wiley Publishers. Its business model involves aggregating questions and answers from various sources, including publishers, universities, and individual physicians, into a single platform.

== Test preparation ==
The company offers board review programs to individuals, medical schools, residency programs, teaching hospitals, and other medical facilities in the United States and abroad. As of January 2025, BoardVitals provides question banks for over 67 medical exams and specialties, covering 17 specialty fields:

- Surgery
- Radiology
- Psychiatry
- Podiatry
- Pediatrics
- Pathology
- Obstetrics and gynecology
- Neurology
- Medicine
- Internal medicine
- General surgery
- Family medicine
- Emergency medicine
- Dermatology
- Cardiology
- Anesthesiology
- Allergy and immunology

Each exam provides feedback on user performance, including comparisons to peers and detailed statistics. Users can customize practice tests to suit their needs, with advanced statistics available for review. BoardVitals guarantees that users will pass their board review.

According to Paul, the company plans to expand into additional fields in the coming years.

== Reception ==
Paul has been recognized as one of the top ten disruptive women in healthcare startups. Gust.com named BoardVitals as a 'Most Promising' startup in New York. The company has been featured in business profiles by publications such as CNN, Forbes, and Fox News.
