= Xfund =

American venture capital firm

- Formation: January 27, 2012; 14 years ago in Cambridge, Massachusetts as The Experiment Fund
- Founders: Patrick Chung, Hugo Van Vuuren
- Type: Private
- Headquarters: Cambridge, Massachusetts and Palo Alto, California, United States
- Services: Early stage venture capital
- Fields: Consumer technology Enterprise technology Healthcare
- Key people: Patrick Chung; Brandon Farwell
- Website: xfund.com

Xfund is an American venture capital firm with offices in Palo Alto, California and Cambridge, Massachusetts. It provides early-stage venture capital to entrepreneurs across multiple disciplines. Xfund was founded as the Experiment Fund in 2012 as a partnership between the venture capital companies New Enterprise Associates, Accel Partners, Breyer Capital, and Polaris Partners. Anchored at Harvard University’s School of Engineering and Applied Sciences (SEAS), it was established to make seed-stage investments in startups developed at Harvard and MIT, although the fund has been open to all founders regardless of university affiliation from the start. In 2014 the fund formally renamed itself Xfund (an abbreviation of "Experiment Fund"), and raised $100 million in a second fund, Xfund 2. A third fund in 2020 raised $120 million. The first investor in most of its portfolio companies, Xfund's partners have invested companies such as 23andMe, Kensho, Gusto, Plaid, Robinhood, Patreon, Andela, and Philo.

== History ==
=== Founding (2012-2014) ===
The Experiment Fund was launched in January 2012 as a $10 million seed fund and incubator designed specifically to support student start-ups and develop technologies and platforms created in Cambridge, Massachusetts. Although anchored at Harvard's School of Engineering and Applied Sciences, the fund was made open to all founders regardless of university affiliation from the start. It was initially run with Patrick Chung representing New Enterprise Associates (NEA)'s interests and Hugo Van Vuuren as the fund's "on the ground" person in Cambridge. Early advisors included Harvard faculty members David Edwards, Harry Lewis, Cherry Murray, and John Palfrey, in addition to Facebook co-founder Andrew McCollum, Jim Breyer, and NEA's Harry Weller. To avoid potential conflicts of interest, Harvard had no financial stake in the Experiment Fund.

In June 2012, Accel Partners, Breyer Capital, and Polaris Venture Partners joined NEA as investors. Experiment Fund identified around 3500 investment opportunities in its first two years. Of that number, it evaluated 900 companies and invested in five, including Philo, Zumper, Kensho, and Ravel Law. The average markup of the portfolio from seed valuation to valuation in May 2014 was over 10x. Approximately 40% of the deal-flow in the original fund came from companies launched by Harvard students, faculty and staff, while 25% came from MIT-affiliated entrepreneurs and 9% from Stanford University. In May 2014, Patrick Chung joined The Experiment Fund full-time.

=== Recent history (2014-2021) ===
In December 2014, the fund raised $100 million in capital commitments for a second fund, which was officially renamed Xfund. Among Xfund's limited partners were Goldman Sachs, Saudi Aramco, Jasper Ridge and Breyer Capital. Still based at Harvard, by 2015, the company had considered 3,500 investments and made 10. In January 2016, Van Vuuren contacted Xfund's Limited Partners Advisory Committee (LPAC) and accused Chung of mismanagement in the firing of an employee. Separately, Chung contacted the LPAC requesting intervention and raised questions about Van Vuuren's stability. In March 2016, the LPAC voted to keep Chung in charge as managing partner and remove Van Vuuren entirely from the fund's affairs. Van Vuuren sued Xfund and Chung in May 2016, alleging fraud, breach of fiduciary duty, defamation, and a violation of California's two-party consent law. The case was privately settled in February 2017. Brandon Farwell, formerly of DFJ and RV, subsequently joined Xfund as a partner in 2017. With all original investors remaining involved, Chung and Farwell invested in companies such as Zumper, 23andMe, and Landit, among others.

In 2020, Xfund announced its third fund, Xfund 3. Originally intending to raise $100 million, it was oversubscribed and accepted $120 million in commitments, with the fund led by NEA and Breyer Capital. At the time, in contrast to venture funding at large where 3% of funding goes to female-led companies, by September 2020, "one-third of Xfund’s capital [was] invested in companies with women founder/CEOs, and 72 percent of the firm’s capital backs companies led by women, minorities, or immigrants." Also, startups from Harvard comprised "about 25 percent of Xfund’s investments, with 20 percent coming from MIT, 10 percent from Stanford and another 7 percent from University of California, Berkeley. As the first investor in most of its portfolio companies, by 2020 the company had also invested in Curebase, Natalist, AeroVect, Segment, Guideline, NewtonX, and Lighthouse.

== See also ==
- List of venture capital firms
