= Business Angel Network of Southeast Asia =

Venture capital company in Singapore

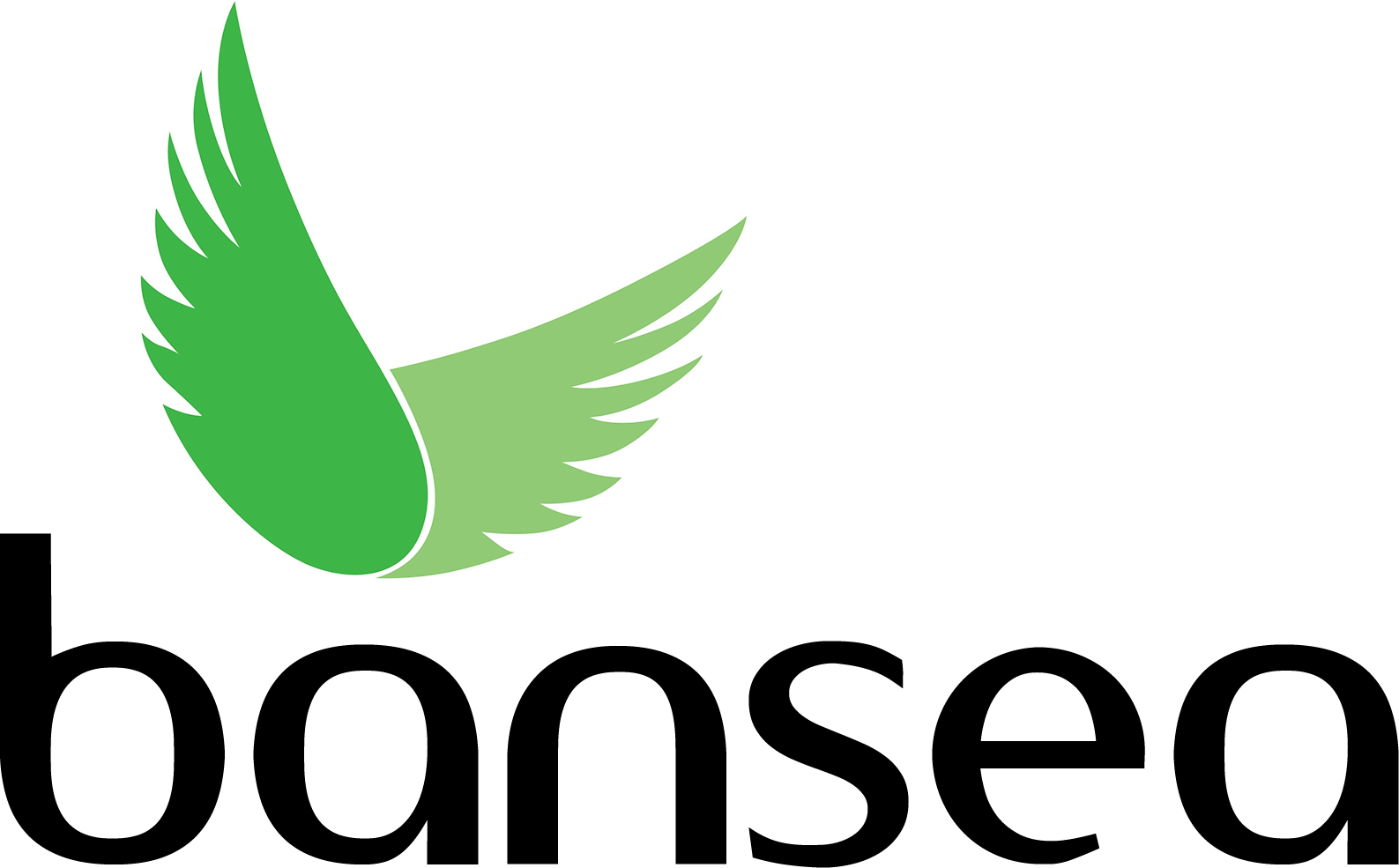
- Type: Public Company Limited By Guarantee
- Industry: Venture Capital
- Founded: 2001
- Headquarters: Singapore
- Area served: Southeast Asia
- Key people: Koh Jiaway (Associate Director); Dr Michelle Kung (Ambassador); Dr Rex Yeap (Chair); Rebekah Woo (Vice Chair); Sam Tsui (Vice Chair)
- Website: www.bansea.org

Business Angel Network of Southeast Asia (BANSEA) is an angel investment network based in Singapore that provides information to potential investors about newly established businesses. The stated goal of BANSEA is to create business opportunities for angel investors, and aid in the development of profitable business networks.

BANSEA's core activities include monthly investor meetings, where startups are invited to pitch to BANSEA members. BANSEA focuses on early-stage companies seeking investment ranging from $100,000 to $1,000,000. It has two tiers of membership–chartered membership and ordinary membership–with membership qualification criteria.

== History ==
BANSEA was established in 2001 by Dr. Poh Kam Wong, Professor and Director of the NUS Entrepreneurship Centre, and has been financially supported by SPRING Singapore since 2007. BANSEA maintains close relationships with the NUS Entrepreneurship Centre and the National Research Foundation, and is also an investment partner of Info-comm Investments. The SPRING Seeds program by SPRING Singapore was the result of consultation between the government and BANSEA leadership.

In 2008, BANSEA announced a strategic relationship with the Agency for Science, Technology, and Research (A*STAR). In 2009, BANSEA announced a strategic alliance with the Angel Association of New Zealand. In 2013, BANSEA signed a collaboration agreement with the European Trade Association for Business Angels (EBAN) to foster cross-border investment, dissemination of initiatives, exchange of best practices and a close collaboration for future projects.

In 2016, BANSEA launched the BANSEA One fund, pooling capital from angel investors to invest in startups. It is also a co-founding member of the ASEAN Angel Alliance (AAA) (now known as ASEAN Business Angel Alliance (ABAA)) and joined the Global Business Angels Network, which allows angel investors to expand their network around the world.

In 2017, BANSEA announced it had signed a memorandum of understanding with Action Community for Entrepreneurship (ACE) to grow investment opportunities, growth and market access for startups and angel investors in Southeast Asia. In 2018, BANSEA inked an agreement with Platform E to nurture angel investors and startups, as well as launched the BANSEA Two fund, pooling capital from angel investors to invest in startups following the success of the BANSEA One fund.

== Investments ==
Startups that BANSEA and its members have invested in include Paktor, Bambu, Tokenize.exchange, Burpple, Carousell, 99.co, Carro, and Shopback.

== See also ==
- Seed funding
- Series A funding
