= Fran Hauser =

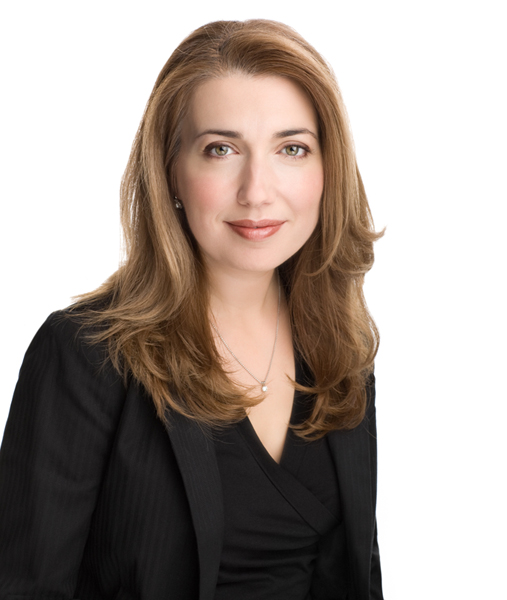
- Venture Capitalist and Angel Investor
- Born: Francesca Cambareri; October 28, 1968 (age 57); Reggio Calabria, Italy
- Education: Pace University, New York City
- Occupations: Venture Capitalist, Digital Media Executive
- Writing career
- Subjects: Publishing, Digital, Entertainment, Philanthropy, Angel Investing, Venture Capital
- Website: www.franhauser.com

Francesca Hauser (born October 28, 1968) is a startup investor and advisor, funding and advising consumer-focused companies such as HelloGiggles, Levo, Mogul, The Wing and Gem&Bolt. Formerly President, Digital for Time Inc.'s Style and Entertainment Group, she is also a philanthropist and advocate for women in business.

== Early life and education ==
Hauser was born in Reggio Calabria, Italy, the eldest daughter of Carmela and Antonio Cambareri. In 1970, Hauser's parents moved the family from Italy to Mount Kisco, NY where Antonio Cambareri continued in the stone masonry trade and Carmela continued her work as a tailor.

Hauser graduated from John F. Kennedy Catholic High School in Somers, NY as salutatorian in 1986. Hauser attended Pace University in Pleasantville and White Plains, NY where she graduated in 1990 summa cum laude with a BBA and MBA in Business Administration. Hauser was the first person in her family to graduate from college.

== Career ==
Hauser began her career in finance, holding positions at Price Waterhouse, Ernst and Young, and Coca-Cola Enterprises until joining Moviefone in 1998. She played an integral role in the $400 million sale of Moviefone to AOL and was later promoted to vice president and general manager of Moviefone and AOL Movies in 2001.

In 2002 she was promoted to Vice President of AOL's Programming Group, where she managed the AOL Teens channel and became one of the liaisons between AOL and Time Inc. The position led to a full-time move to Time Inc. where Hauser was named executive producer of Time Inc. Interactive and was later promoted to general manager.

In 2006, Hauser was named general manager, PEOPLE Digital and then in 2007 was promoted to president, PEOPLE Digital. In 2008, she expanded her responsibilities and was promoted to president, Digital for Time Inc.’s Style and Entertainment Group.

As President, Digital for Time Inc.’s Style and Entertainment Group, Hauser oversaw large-scale distribution partnerships, product development, and acquisitions and was responsible for desktop, mobile, and tablet strategy. During Hauser's tenure, People.com went from 3 million monthly unique visitors to 30 million monthly unique visitors.

In 2010, Hauser led the acquisition and integration of StyleFeeder, Time Inc.’s first major e-commerce investment.

In 2012, Hauser was appointed to also lead Time Inc.’s Innovation Lab, an incubator where employees present ideas and have the opportunity to work in cross-functional, global teams.

In February 2014, Hauser stepped down from her post at Time Inc.

In May 2014, Hauser became a venture partner at Rothenberg Ventures, a venture capital firm. At Rothenberg, Hauser primarily invested in women-led digital media and e-commerce startups. Hauser left Rothenberg Ventures in July 2016. Hauser is also an active angel investor in technology startups including ReturnPath, Levo League, Hullabalu, Zady and HelloGiggles.

Hauser serves as a public speaker on topics such as mentorship, entrepreneurship, digital media, and women in business. Her recent speaking engagements include SheSummit, International Women's Day at the Rye Art Center, the 2016 Pipeline Fellowship Conference, and TechWeek NY.

Hauser makes regular appearances on CNBC's PowerPitch and has written on entrepreneurship, leadership, and investing for publications including Forbes and Inc. Her book, The Myth of the Nice Girl: Achieving a Career You Love Without Becoming a Person You Hate, was released in April 2018 and has been featured in People Magazine, Forbes, Entrepreneur, Time, and other publications. Amazon has named it a best business and investing book.

== Boards and honors ==
In 2011, Hauser was named to FOLIO magazine’s annual “FOLIO: 40”, which honors publishing and media influencers. She was recognized in 2009 as one of Advertising Age's “Women to Watch”. In 2014, she was named as one of the Six Most Powerful Women in New York City's Tech Scene by Refinery29.

In 2010, Hauser was honored by the Girl Scouts Council of Greater New York for her leadership and in 2015, Hauser received the YWCA's premier W Award.

For her impact on the media industry, in 2008, Hauser was inducted into the Media Industry Newsletter's (MIN) Digital Hall of Fame, as well as named a Punch Sulzberger Fellow by the Columbia Journalism School.

In 2008, PEOPLE.com was named “Website of the Year: Entertainment” by Magazine Publishers of America (MPA). In 2008, Adweek gave PEOPLE its top digital honor: Magazine Website of the Year.

Hauser is an advocate for global women's and children's issues and an early funder of PBS documentary Half the Sky. She is chairman of the board of directors of GlobalGiving and is co-founder of GlobalGiving's New York Leadership Council. Hauser has challenged GlobalGiving to raise $1 billion for grassroots projects in the next five years. She also serves on the advisory board of Helpusadopt.org.

Hauser has mentored hundreds of women around the world. She serves as an advisor for Rent the Runway's Project Entrepreneur, a venture competition and educational program for female entrepreneurs. In that capacity, she created a template that assists women formulate their first pitch.

She is an advisory board member for the nonprofit WomenOne and supports TIA Girl Club and the 92Y Women inPower Fellowship.

In March 2016, Hauser was featured in Mogul's IAmAMogul campaign for "leading the way for all women to have a voice worldwide."

== Personal life ==
Hauser and her husband of 20 years, Frank Hauser, live in Bedford, New York with their two sons.
