= Philo (company) =

American internet television company

- Company type: Private company
- Website type: OTT platform
- Founded: 2010; 16 years ago (as Tivli)
- Headquarters: San Francisco, California, U.S.
- Owners: Skydance Direct-to-Consumer (Skydance); A+E Global Media (Hearst Communications); AMC Global Media
- Founders: Tuan Ho; Nick Krasney
- Key people: Mike Keyserling (CEO)
- Industry: Pay television
- Employees: 100
- Website: www.philo.com
- Users: 1.3 million

Philo (formerly known as Tivli) is an American over-the-top streaming television company based in San Francisco, California. The service is available as free channels access or expanded tier subscription plans. First founded at Harvard University in 2010 by Tuan Ho and Nicholas Krasney, investors in the company include Skydance, AMC Global Media and A+E Global Media, along with Andrew McCollum and Mark Cuban. The company and its service is named in honor of one of the pioneering engineers of television, Philo T. Farnsworth. As of February 2025, Philo has over 1,300,000 subscribers. As of September 2025, Philo's Core subscription offering includes AMC+ and access to HBO Max and Discovery+ apps.

== History ==
=== Early history (2010–2016) ===
Philo was originally founded in 2010 as Tivli by Tuan Ho and Nicholas Krasney at Harvard University. It began as an experimental dorm-room streaming project using aluminium foil as a makeshift receiving antenna to "pick up (Boston area) TV signals and deliver them wirelessly to their laptops via a jerry-rigged server". At its launch, the project was intended to be a way to provide a streaming TV service to Harvard University students living on campus. When the service first launched in 2011, a quarter of the Harvard resident population registered for it within the first few weeks of the service.

In 2011, Tivli joined the Harvard Innovation Lab (iLab) as the first company in residence, before finally moving into their own office in Harvard Square in 2013. In 2012, Christopher Thorpe joined as CEO to build out Philo's original university IPTV service. From the earliest days, Philo had aspirations to launch a nationwide streaming TV service, starting in universities. After launching services at Harvard, Philo quickly added additional universities such as Stanford University, Yale University, Texas A&M University, and Brown University. In 2013, Philo announced a strategic partnership with HBO to provide the HBO GO service to universities. By September 2015, the service was available in 42 universities.

In July 2013, the venture raised a $6.3 million round led by Patrick Chung at venture capital firm New Enterprise Associates. Among the Series A investors, were Mark Cuban from Radical Investments LP, HBO, Ari Emanuel from Endeavor, and Rho Capital Partners. The same year the company was rebranded as Philo, from its former name, Tivli.

In 2014, Andrew McCollum, a founding member of Facebook, succeeded Christopher Thorpe as CEO to further expand Philo beyond providing university IPTV services and launch a direct-to-consumer over-the-top streaming service called Philo. After securing their Series B round in 2015, Philo relocated to San Francisco, California.

In June 2015, Philo raised $10 million in a Series B round led by New Enterprise Associates, with joint investment from HBO, Rho Ventures, Xfund, CBC New Media Group, as well as Andrew McCollum.

=== Recent history (2017–present) ===
Philo launched its OTT streaming television service in the United States on November 14, 2017. The service is available via TVs, digital media players, computers, tablets, and phones. The service includes channels from A&E Networks, AMC Networks, Discovery, Inc. (prior to its 2022 merger with WarnerMedia to form Warner Bros. Discovery, now Skydance), and Viacom (prior to its 2019 reunion with CBS Corporation to form ViacomCBS, later known as Paramount Global, then Paramount Skydance and now also Skydance), all of which also became joint owners of the service with a combined $25 million investment before this launch.

The service has no local television stations or sports networks, though it does offer news services through BBC News (which is distributed by AMC), CBS News 24/7 (distributed by Paramount Skydance), and financial news channel Cheddar, along with the national feed of the AccuWeather Network.

In October 2018, Philo added Hallmark Channel and its sister channels, Hallmark Movies & Mysteries and Hallmark Drama.

In February 2020, Google Fiber announced it would no longer offer television packages to new subscribers. It backed YouTube TV and fuboTV at the time and added the $20 package of Philo's 61 channels as an option. Adding Philo to the list of Google Fiber was described as a way to help the virtual MVPD "keep its growth streak going" without the burden of retransmission consent negotiations and fees needed to run a pay television service. At the time, Philo had 750,000 subscribers and the service said that over the year it had grown by 300%. Philo then added Epix and Starz as premium add-ons in June of the same year, along with TV Everywhere credentials to their websites and access to their video-on-demand libraries.

On March 29, 2021, T-Mobile announced a partnership with Philo to offer a discount on the service when bundled with its wireless plans. September 8 saw the debut of a "Movies & More" add-on package, which includes Sony Movies, Reelz, HDNet Movies, MGM HD and Cinémoi. Philo would be a launch partner of Comcast's revival of G4, launching the network on November 16. GAC Media channels, GAC Living and GAC Family, were added to the service at the start of December 2021.

In February 2022, Philo reached an agreement with entertainment company, Kin, to bring over 65 hours of programming to its platforms along with producing Philo's first original series, Boss Moves with Rasheeda. Later in the year, Philo added around a half-dozen channels operated by Weigel Broadcasting, including MeTV, MeTV+, Heroes & Icons, Catchy Comedy and Story Television. In October 2022, Philo added FETV to its base subscription package and Family Movie Classics to the "Movies & More" add-on package.

In May 2023, Philo expanded its "free TV" lineup with nine new channels: The Bob Ross Channel, Comedy Dynamics, Cowboy Way, Drag Race Universe, FailArmy, Outside TV, People are Awesome, the Pet Collective and Screambox. Despite being listed in the "free TV" section of Philo's electronic program guide, the channels can't be accessed unless a user signs up for Philo's $28 a month package.

In March 2024, Dish announced a partnership with Philo to offer advertisers access to Philo's inventory. On June 25, 2024, Philo added MeTV Toons to its channel lineup on the day the channel launched.

In January 2025, AMC’s ALLBLK channel became available as an add-on to Philo's ad-free subscription.

In February 2025, Philo announced that it had reached 1.3 million paid subscribers, representing a 20% increase compared to 2023. The company also disclosed its revenue for the first time, reporting $450 million in revenue by the end of 2024, up approximately 10% year-over-year. In an official statement, Philo said it expects to reach profitability in 2025.

In April 2026, 365BLK and Outlaw were added to Philo as part of their "free TV" lineup.
