= Technology Incubation Scheme =

Government funding program

The Technology Incubation Scheme (TIS) was a government funding program of the National Research Foundation (NRF) of Singapore. The scheme was started in 2009 and ended on 30 June 2016.

== Details of the Program ==
The TIS program selected funds that matched the following criteria:

- Funds that can incubate and nurture young start-ups prior to venture capital funding.
- The program matches investments up-to 85% co-funding of a private incubator (maximum S$500,000).
- Incubators have the option to buy out NRF's equity of the company. Option is valid for 3 years (post TIS investment).

== Incubators accepted into the Program ==
As of 1 August 2013, there are currently 14 approved funds to work with the Singapore Government as part of the program:

- The Biofactory
- Clearbridge Accelerator
- Get2Volume
- Golden Gate Ventures
- Incuvest
- Jungle Ventures
- Plug&Play Singapore
- Red Dot Ventures
- Small World Group
- Stream Global
- Silicon Straits
- TechCube8
- TNF Ventures
- Wavemakers Labs

== Funded under Technology Incubation Scheme ==
- Rainmaker Labs - Singapore Mobile App Development Company
