= Amir Gal-Or =

Israeli businessman

- אמיר גלאור
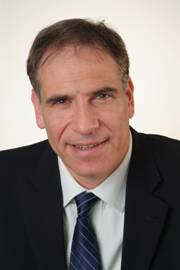
- Amir Gal-Or in 2006
- Born: September 5, 1962 (age 63); Haifa, Israel
- Occupations: Entrepreneur, venture capitalist
- Children: 4, including Raz

Amir Gal-Or (Hebrew: אמיר גלאור; born September 5, 1962) is an Israeli businessman involved in venture capital, technologies, and East Asian enterprises. He is the founder and managing partner of Infinity Group, and founder and chairman of Innonation. Gal-Or served as a pilot in the Israeli Air Force.

== Biography ==
Gal-Or was born on September 5, 1962, in Haifa, Israel. His parents, Leah and Benjamin, are professors at the Technion-Israel Institute of Technology. Gal-Or's mother specializes in chemistry and materials; his father specializes in machinery. Gal-Or attended the Hebrew Reali School in Haifa, where he graduated from the Science-Physics Department. Gal-Or earned a BSc in economics and business management from the University of Haifa and an MBA from Tel Aviv University. Later he graduated from Harvard University's program in venture capital and private equity investments. Gal-Or has published his new book "Working with the Chinese" in Hebrew.

Gal-Or has four children: Raz, Amit, Talia and Hila.

== Air force career ==
Gal-Or served as a combat pilot in the Israeli Air Force (IDF/AF) for 24 years, flying the F-4 Phantom, F-16 and A-4 Skyhawk. He was also a member of the IDF/AF aerobatic team. On October 16, 1986, he flew in the same formation with Israeli MIA navigator/weapon systems officer (WSO) Ron Arad, who went missing that day. Gal-Or is retired from active reserve duty and serves as an instructor in the military flying school.

== Business career ==
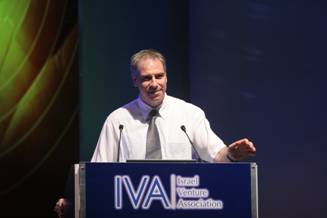
Amir Gal-Or addresses attendees of the Israel Venture Association Conference in Tel Aviv

Gal-Or's career as a private entrepreneur began at the Technion incubator in 1990 upon completing seven years of army service. He returned home to Haifa, registered at the University of Haifa and, together with his mother, established two materials companies: TAN, developing high-grade refractory ceramic oxides, and a venture with the largest Israeli fuels company: Paz Oil Company. Eventually, the latter venture integrated with Paz in exchange for royalties, and TAN was sold. In 1994, Gal-Or was nominated as a manager of Mati Ra'anana, a business development center in Ra'anana jointly established by the JDC, the Ministry of Absorption, the Israel Small and Medium Enterprise Authority (ISMEA), ESRA organization, and the Ra'anana Municipality.

In 1998, Gal-Or switched to venture capital and helped found Infinity Group. In 2002 the Office of the Chief Scientist (OCS) of Israel began a program to privatize the technology incubators. Under the umbrella of Infinity, Gal-Or founded Maayan Ventures, a publicly traded company, where he serves as chairman. Maayan, headquartered in Beersheva, is a working partner of the Israeli government for seed investments and manages more than 60 investment holdings. Infinity also operates technology incubators in Dimona and Sde Boker and is purchasing a share in the incubator in Ofakim. Each incubator has a specialization and Infinity provides them with services and support.

Infinity, backed by the China Development Bank and Clal Industries, manages over US$1.5 billion and has 23 funds, incubators, and accelerators established throughout China. Notable exits of the fund include: Galileo, Saifun, Shopping.com, ShellCase, Scitex Vision, Digital China, WLCSP, Bazun, and ITS.

In 2017, Gal-Or was bestowed with the Friendship Award by the Chinese government for his great contribution to China-Israel business relations over the past nearly two decades. The award is the highest honor granted to foreign experts by the Chinese government for their contributions to the country's economic progress.

In January 2020 Gal-or was nominated to be the honorary president of the Israel Chamber of Commerce in China or IsCham (Chinese: 中国以色列商会).

Gal-Or is involved in defense technologies, including unmanned aerial systems, AI-driven cybersecurity, and next-generation avionics. His role includes evaluation and instruction in these technologies, applying his experience in their development and implementation in the defense sector.

== See also ==
- Economy of Israel
- Venture capital in Israel
- Science and technology in Israel
- הספר לעבוד עם הסינים
