= Responsive =

American software company

- Formerly: RFPIO, Inc. (until July 2023)
- Type: Privately Held
- Industry: Cloud Computing - Software
- Founded: February 19, 2015; 11 years ago
- Founders: Ganesh Shankar (CEO), AJ Sunder (CIO), Sankar Lagudu (COO)
- Headquarters: Beaverton, Oregon, US
- Key people: Ganesh Shankar (CEO), AJ Sunder (CIO), Sankar Lagudu (COO), Jeff Santelices (CRO), Michael Londgren (CMO), Manish Bafna (SVP of Technology)
- Services: Request for proposal (RFP) software, Proposal management software
- Number of employees: 500 (2024)
- Website: www.responsive.io

Responsive is a privately owned developer of cloud-based software that automates and streamlines the process of responding to a request for proposal (RFP) based in Beaverton, Oregon. The company also maintains an office in Coimbatore, India. Founded in 2015, the company has more than 150,000 users worldwide after tripling its user base in 2019 and sustaining growth during the global pandemic. Responsive software has supported more than $20 billion in RFP responses.

== History ==
The company was founded in February 2015 by Ganesh Shankar, AJ Sunder, and Sankar Lagudu to streamline RFP processes for mid-to-large enterprises. Responsive was formed to address the problems Shankar and his colleagues experienced gathering information and compiling responses for RFPs and being unable to find a suitable automation solution. By developing a cloud-based proposal management system, Shankar aimed to simplify and automate the RFP process and make it easier for cross-functional teams to collaborate.

The company experienced rapid growth from the outset and reported having 50 employees in Oregon and India at the end of 2018.

On 2 October 2018, the company obtained its first patent involving the conversion and presentation of proposal documents in a user-friendly format. US patent 10089285, "Method to automatically convert proposal documents"

In February 2019, Express Scripts selected the Responsive response management platform as part of a long-term business transformation initiative. Responsive reported over 250% growth and more than 125 employees by the end of 2019.

In January 2020, Responsive expanded its executive team with the additions of Angela Earl, vice president of global marketing, and Mohan Natraj, vice president of customer success. Konnor Martin was also promoted to regional vice president of sales for North America. In July 2020, the company reported a 150% increase in usage of Responsive services, continuing the firm's growth despite the COVID-19 pandemic.

In April 2021, Microsoft reported saving an estimated $2.4M with Responsive's response management software. 18 months after implementation, the Microsoft team gave nearly 7,000 users access to 36,200 ready-to-go RFx responses from Responsive's AI-enabled Answer Library, translating into 12,000 total hours saved.

In August 2021, Responsive acquired RFP360, a Kansas-based RFP software competitor, bringing Responsive's employee count to 300.

In July 2023, RFPIO changed its company name to Responsive.

== Financing ==
Responsive's first round of funding was secured in 2016 through Portland-based investment firm Elevate Capital and from the angel investment group TiE Oregon. In October 2016, Responsive received $100,000 at the Bend Venture Conference for the company's performance in the Growth Stage competition. In December 2016, Stephen Marsh, founder of Smarsh, whose company was an early customer of Responsive, invested $500,000 in the company through his investment vehicle Archivist Capital.

In July 2018, the company secured a $25 million funding round from private equity firm K1 Investment Management to accelerate growth and cashed out some of its early investors. This resulted in an early exit for Elevate Capital and produced significant returns.

== Services ==
Responsive's cloud-based software incorporates artificial intelligence, project management and collaboration capabilities and integrates with common sales management applications to help companies respond to RFPs. The platform also allows salespeople to create personalized, proactive selling documents and has built in e-signature functionality. Companies using Responsive include ADP, Adobe, Britannica Digital Learning, Broadcom, DTI Global, Express Scripts, Google Cloud, Facebook, LinkedIn, Microsoft, Salesforce, Smarsh, Zoom and others from across multiple industry segments.

== Awards and recognition ==
In 2020, Responsive was ranked 14th in a list of the top 100 software products for 2020 out of the more than 57,000 software companies listed on G2 Crowd, a crowd-sourced software review service. The company also received a Silver Stevie Award for Customer Service Department of the year, was named a top 10 tech startup in Oregon by The Tech Tribune, and listed 7th on a list of fastest-growing companies in Portland, Ore. by Growjo. The company received the award for Best Project Management Cloud Service in the 2019-20 Cloud Awards. CEO Ganesh Shankar won the EY Entrepreneur Of The Year 2020 Pacific Northwest Region Award and was listed 5th in Comparably's list of top CEOs for diversity. Responsive was also named to Comparably lists for Top 50 Best Companies for Work-Life Balance, Top 50 Happiest Employees, and Top 50 Best Perks & Benefits. In August 2022, Responsive's HR Shipra Kamra was featured on the front cover of the Portland Business Journal and was also featured on Women We Admire's list of Top 50 Women Leaders of Oregon.

== See also ==
- List of companies based in Oregon
