= Quest Ventures =

Singapore-based venture capital firm

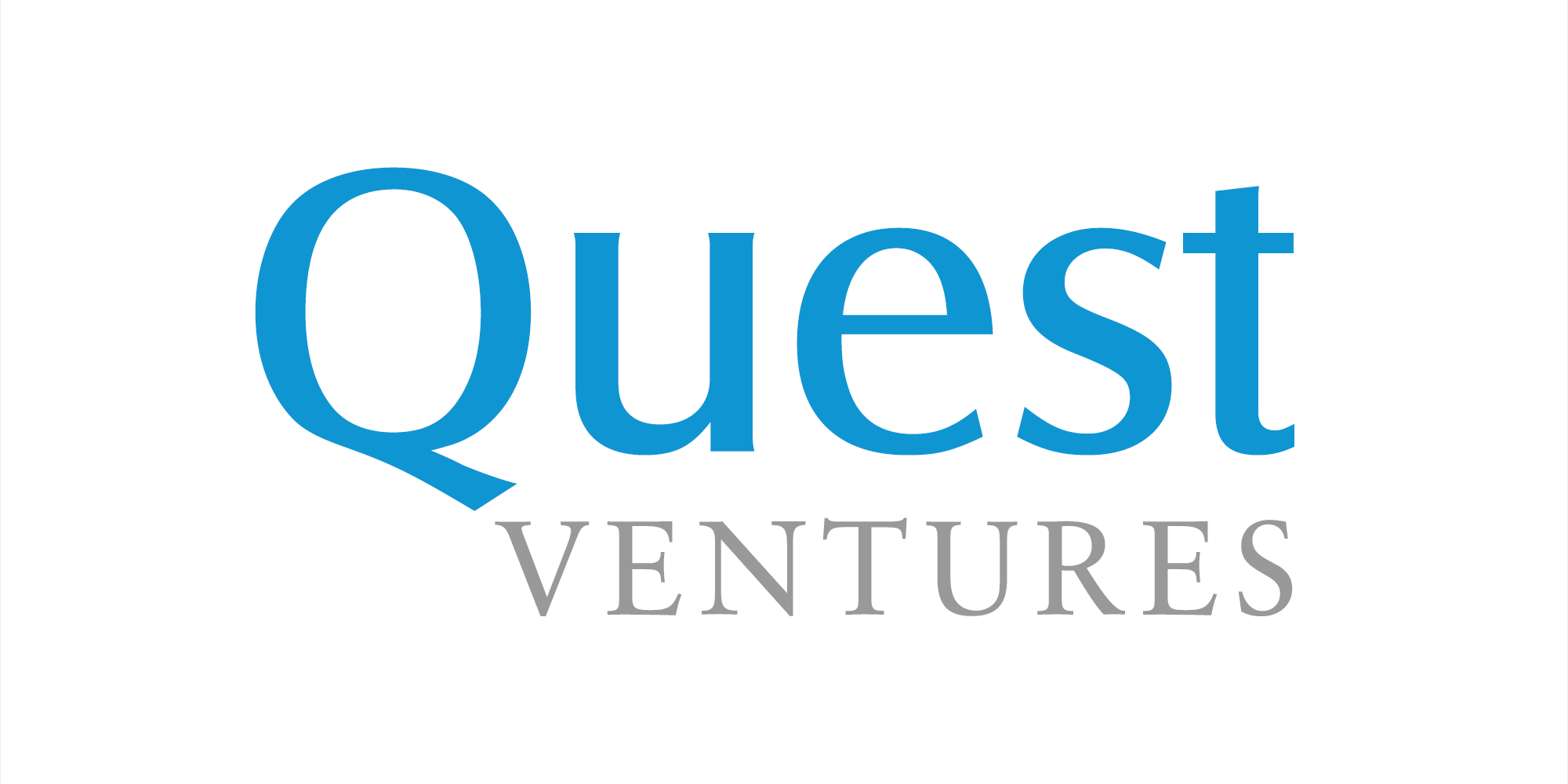
- Type: Private Limited
- Industry: Venture Capital
- Founded: 2011
- Founder: James Tan, Wang Yunming
- Headquarters: Singapore
- Area served: Southeast Asia
- Website: www.questventures.com

Quest Ventures (formerly QuestVC) is a venture capital firm headquartered in Singapore. It invests primarily at the seed and Series A stages in companies in the digital economy across Southeast Asia and Central Asia. The firm was established in 2011 and developed from the early-stage investment activities of technology entrepreneur, James Tan.

== History ==
=== Early years ===
Quest Ventures was established in 2011 under the name QuestVC. Its early activities included investments in companies in China and Southeast Asia.

In 2012, the Media Development Authority of Singapore appointed QuestVC as an investment partner for the iJAM programme, which provided funding for technology startups.

In 2014, QuestVC joined the advisory panel of DBS Bank's BusinessClass programme, which supported businesses and startups expanding in Asia.

In 2016, Cradle Fund, a statutory body under the Ministry of Finance of Malaysia, appointed Quest Ventures as a co-investment partner for Malaysian technology startups. That same year, Quest Ventures was also identified as a partner in Malaysia's technology investment ecosystem through a memorandum of understanding with the Malaysia Digital Economy Corporation.

In 2017, the firm changed its name from QuestVC to Quest Ventures and moved its primary operations to Singapore. That same year, Enterprise Singapore appointed the firm under the Startup Singapore Quest programme to make seed-stage investments in Singaporean startups.

Quest Ventures also served as title sponsor of the Quest Ventures-EDGE National Youth Entrepreneurship Awards in 2017.

=== Institutional growth ===
In 2018, Quest Ventures became a signatory to the Principles for Responsible Investment, a United Nations-supported framework for responsible investment.

In 2019, Quest Ventures co-launched the Vietnam Global Innovation programme with Enterprise Singapore and Vietnam's Ministry of Science and Technology.

In 2020, Quest Ventures announced a partnership with ScaleUp Malaysia Accelerator to invest in Malaysian startups. The same year, the firm completed the first close of its Asia Fund; a US$50 million fund backed by Pavilion Capital, an investment arm of Temasek Holdings, and QazTech Ventures, a development institution associated with Kazakhstan's Baiterek National Managing Holding.

Quest Ventures' Asia Fund was also covered by KrASIA in reporting on the firm's fundraising and investment activities in Southeast and Central Asia.

In 2021, SEEDS Capital, a development finance institution of Enterprise Singapore, appointed Quest Ventures as a co-investment partner focused on sustainability-related companies.

In 2022, Singapore's raiSE partnered with Quest Ventures to launch an accelerator programme for social enterprises.

In 2023, Kazakhstan's Science Fund entered into a memorandum of understanding with Quest Ventures concerning cooperation in the country's startup and innovation ecosystem.

In 2024, Quest Ventures was named a Champion of Good by Singapore's National Volunteer and Philanthropy Centre.

=== Later developments ===
In February 2025, Quest Ventures identified the Philippines and Vietnam as areas of planned expansion in Southeast Asia, while continuing to evaluate early-stage investment opportunities in other Asian markets.

In December 2025, the Philippine Department of Information and Communications Technology signed a memorandum of understanding with Quest Ventures and other startup organisations during Philippine Startup Week.

In January 2026, Quest Ventures was named a Social Enterprise Advocate by raiSE during the organisation's 10th anniversary celebrations.

In February 2026, James Tan met with Vietnam's Deputy Minister of Science and Technology, Hoang Minh, to discuss venture capital cooperation and Vietnam's innovation ecosystem.

== Investments ==
Quest Ventures invests primarily at the seed and Series A stages. Its investment focus includes companies in the digital economy in Southeast Asia and Central Asia.

The firm's investments have included Carousell, ShopBack, 99.co, Burpple, Watch Over Me, Carro and Xfers.

The firm's investment activity has also included companies outside Southeast Asia. In 2021, Business Times reported that Sealed Network had raised funding from Quest Ventures and other investors.

== See also ==
- Carousell
- ShopBack
- Startup ecosystem
