= Hugo Van Vuuren =

South African American entrepreneur and investor (born 1984)

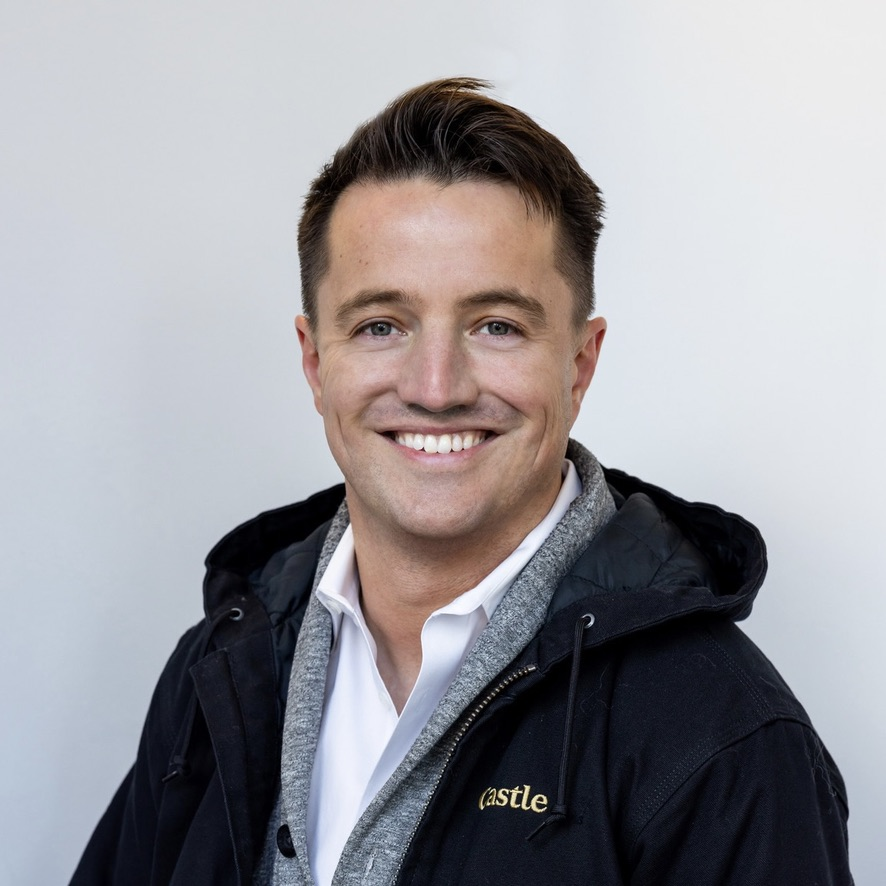
- Van Vuuren in 2024
- Born: 1984 (age 41–42); Pretoria, South Africa
- Education: Harvard College; Harvard Graduate School of Design
- Occupations: Entrepreneur, Investor
- Years active: 2006-present
- Board member of: Work-Bench
- Website: vuur.com

Hugo Van Vuuren (born 1984) is a South African American entrepreneur and investor. An expert-in-residence at the Harvard School of Engineering and Applied Sciences, he is the co-founder of Work-Bench, an early stage enterprise technology venture fund.

== Early life and education ==
Van Vuuren was born in Pretoria, South Africa. In 2003, Van Vuuren began undergraduate studies at Harvard, and graduated with a BA in economics in 2007. He earned a master's degree in design studies from the Harvard Graduate School of Design in 2012.

While pursuing his postgraduate degree, Van Vuuren was awarded fellowships by the MIT Media Lab, TED and Pop Tech. He was a graduate student fellow at the Berkman Center for Internet & Society at Harvard University from September 2010 through May 2012, and a scholar at the Aspen Institute in 2011.

== Career ==
=== Harvard Entrepreneurship ===
At Harvard, Van Vuuren worked closely on art and science experiments and startup projects with professor David Edwards, whom he had first encountered in 2007 as student in Edwards' "Idea Translation" class. In 2008, along with several others in the class, Van Vuuren co-developed off-grid microbial fuel cells for use in sub-Saharan Africa. The research and project was funded by private investors, the Harvard Institute for Global Health, MIT IDEAS Global Challenge, as well as a $200,000 Lighting Africa grant from the World Bank and a Bill & Melinda Gates Foundation Challenges Grant.

In 2009, Van Vuuren worked with Edwards to establish ArtScience Labs (also known as the Laboratory at Harvard). An interdisciplinary platform for idea experimentation and exhibition in the arts and sciences, it was modeled after Le Laboratoire, an experimental art and design center in Paris. Van Vuuren served as the lab's director from its 2009 launch until 2012.

=== Experiment Fund ===
Based on the growing ecosystem of startups at Harvard, and demonstrated in part by the success of the Lab, the Experiment Fund was founded in January 2012. A seed-stage investment fund co-founded and led by Van Vuuren, it was established specifically to support student start-ups and technologies and platforms created in Cambridge (or by people educated in Cambridge). The Experiment Fund was backed by Breyer Capital, Accel Partners, Polaris Partners, Harvard University, and NEA. Patrick Chung and Harry Weller, both NEA partners, were co-founders of the fund, as were Polaris' Alan Crane, and Jim Breyer of Breyer Capital. Edwards served as an advisor. The company's early investments included Kensho, Philo (formerly Tivli), Zumper, and Rest Devices, among others.

In 2014 Van Vuuren partnered with Chung to create Xfund. Focused on "technically gifted entrepreneurs with a liberal arts mindset," Van Vuuren left the company after a high-profile dispute with Chung. Chung filed a lawsuit, and Van Vuuren countersued. The suit was settled privately in 2016.

=== Work-Bench Ventures ===
With Thomas Quinlan, the president and chief executive of RR Donnelly & Sons Company and Jonathan Lehr, a veteran of Morgan Stanley, Van Vuuren founded Work-Bench Ventures in early 2012. A New York-based enterprise technology VC fund, Work-Bench has invested in APX Labs, DialPad (formerly Switch), True Office, VTS, X.ai, and vArmour, among others.
