= Infinity Group =

Israeli-Chinese investment company

Infinity group
- Native name: 英飞尼迪集团
- Company type: State-owned enterprise
- Industry: Private equity Venture capital
- Founded: 1993; 33 years ago
- Founder: Amir Gal-Or
- Headquarters: Tel Aviv, Israel
- AUM: US$1.5 billion (2023)
- Website: www.infinity-equity.com

Infinity Group is a private equity fund backed by China Development Bank and Clal Industries. The head of Infinity Group is Amir Gal-Or. Infinity Group manages RMB 10 billion and 100 portfolio companies, through 17 local RMB funds throughout China.

Infinity is headquartered in Tel Aviv with offices in Beijing, Changzhou, Chengdu, Chongqing, Harbin, Hong Kong, Hongze, Jining, New York, Nanjing, Ningbo, Shanghai, Shijiazhuang, Suzhou, Suqian, Tianjin, Xiamen and Yangzhou. Infinity's funds since 1993 have included the $23 million Nitzanim Fund of 1993, the $90 million Infinity I in 1999, the $64 million Infinity II in 2002, and the $75 million Infinity IDB in 2002. In 2004, the firm partnered with China-Singapore Suzhou Industrial Park Ventures Company Ltd., or CSVC, to establish a $15 million Infinity-CSVC fund. In 2006, the firm established the $300 million Infinity I-China fund, the successor to the Infinity-CSVC fund and its second Israel-China fund.

== Infinity-CSVC ==
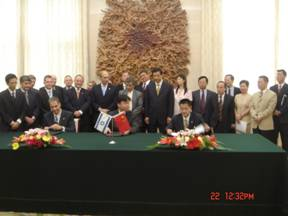
Signing ceremony launching Infinity-CSVC China Fund, June 22, 2004

The Infinity-CSVC China Fund was founded in 2004. It received the first license issued to a foreign-managed onshore RMB denominated fund. The number on the certificate reads 00001.

== Infinity I-China ==
In March 2010, Infinity I-China launched six new joint venture private equity funds throughout China in the cities of Beijing, Suzhou, Harbin, Shijiazhuang, Changzhou, Ningbo and Tianjin. The funds range from 200 million renminbi up to a planned 500 million renminbi. The funds invest in high-technology companies in life sciences, information technology and clean energy and technology.

== Infinity Joint Venture Funds ==
Infinity currently manages 17 joint venture funds throughout China The funds support local Chinese businesses through the influx of technology and knowledge, mainly from Israel, though also from the US and Europe.

== Infinity IP Bank ==
In September 2010, Infinity Group established the Infinity IP (intellectual property) Bank. The IP Bank is headquartered in Suzhou, China. The IP Bank acquires intellectual property from Israel, and from other countries, for use by Chinese companies. The IP Bank also supports those Chinese companies with financing and management services.

== Smart Innovation Cities ==
In May 2013, Infinity announced the Beijing Eco-Valley Project. Eco-Valley is in Beijing, China. It is the first Sino-Israeli 'smart' agriculture city.

== Initial Public Offerings ==
On December 30, 2013, Infinity portfolio company DCITS, a Chinese IT service provider, had an A-share listing on the Shenzhen Stock Exchange via a reverse merger between DCITS and Shenzhen Techo Telecom. On February 10, 2014, WLCSP listed on the Shanghai Stock Exchange at a market cap of more than $1B. WLCSP is the first company with foreign co-founders to have gone public in China. Infinity is among the co-founders. WLCSP was founded with the IP license purchased by Infinity and partners from ShellCase, Jerusalem, Israel, at the end of 2005.

== See also ==
- Oriza Holdings
- Yozma Fund
