= Hullabalu =

Media company

Hullabalu, Inc. is a New York City-based startup in the children's media space. The company was founded by Suzanne Xie in early 2012, focused on building the next generation of interactive storytelling apps on mobile devices. The company released its first story book to the Apple iTunes store, titled "Pan: The Fearless Beribolt" for iPad on June 6, 2013. The company released its next installment introducing a new character in the summer of 2013. In 2017 the company launched the platform Lightwell, an app-creation engine.

== Overview ==
Pandora, or "Pan" for short, is the lead female heroine in the form of a purple panda. The first installment follows Pan through her adventures in exploring the world of Hullabalu, and allows children to interact and direct the story at their own pace. With iPad usage among children growing faster than ever, there is even greater demand for high-quality, intelligent and engaging entertainment designed just for them. Hullabalu's Pan series is native to the iPad, requiring input from the reader. Every moment in the story advances only when directed, making each reader an integral part of the plot. Text appears with narration, setting the stage for early reading success and helping kids expand their vocabulary and imagination.

Hullabalu's $1.8M seed round is led by a list of top-tier angels and funds including SV Angel; Rothenberg Ventures; Liberty City Ventures; Great Oaks Venture Capital; Alexis Ohanian, Cofounder of Reddit; Garry Tan, Cofounder of Posterous and Partner at YC; Gokul Rajaram, Head of Ads at Facebook and Brian Sugar, Founder of Sugar.
