= Hustle Fund =

- Type: Private
- Industry: Venture capital
- Founded: 2017
- Founders: Elizabeth Yin; Eric Bahn
- Headquarters: San Francisco, U.S.
- Website: www.hustlefund.vc

Hustle Fund is an early-stage venture capital firm headquartered in San Francisco. The firm was founded in 2017 by venture capitalists Elizabeth Yin and Eric Bahn.

Hustle Fund invests primarily in pre-seed and seed-stage startups. The firm has raised multiple venture funds, including an $11.5 million inaugural fund and a $30 million second fund, according to reporting by technology and business publications. Hustle Fund also operates an educational program Angel Squad

== History ==
Hustle Fund was established in 2017 by Elizabeth Yin and Eric Bahn. Yin previously served as a partner at 500 Startups before founding Hustle Fund.

In 2018, the firm closed an $11.5 million inaugural fund focused on investing in early-stage startups.[ In 2020, Hustle Fund raised a $30 million second fund to continue its pre-seed and seed investment strategy. Hustle Fund has funded many startups, including Unlimited, Revive, The Alloy Market, Webflow, NerdWallet, Boom, and Gamma.
