= Arch Venture Partners =

American Venture Capital firm

ARCH Venture Management LLC
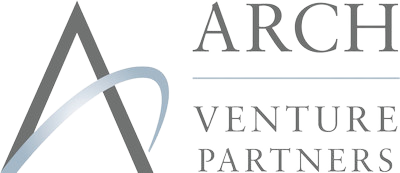
- Trade name: ARCH Venture Partners
- Type: Private
- Industry: Venture Capital
- Founded: 1986; 40 years ago
- Founders: Steven Lazarus; Clinton Bybee; Keith Crandell; Robert Nelsen
- Headquarters: Chicago, Illinois, U.S.
- Products: Investments
- AUM: US$9 billion (2022)
- Website: archventure.com

ARCH Venture Management LLC (known as Arch Venture Partners and Arch) is an American venture capital firm based in Chicago. The firm mainly invests in companies from the biotechnology industry but has also invested other industries such as semiconductors and technology.

== Background ==
In 1986, the Arch Development Corporation was initially created by the University of Chicago and the Argonne National Laboratory as a non-profit initiative to commercialize the technology developed by them. The name Arch reflects this origin with "Ar" from Argonne and "ch" from the University of Chicago. Arch Development Corporation was led by Steven Lazarus who was Deputy Dean of University of Chicago Booth School of Business. Lazarus noted that spin-off company plans were hindered by lack of external capital, so a venture fund would be created to provide it.

In 1989, the University of Chicago and Argonne National Laboratory provided around $9 million in capital for Arch Development Corporation's first fund, Arch Venture Fund Limited Partnership. It was believed to be first venture capital fund to be established between a major U.S. laboratory and university and the first to be fully pledged by a group of investors. The first fund invested in twelve companies with 7–8 of them being successful investments.

After the success of the first fund, the university stated it no longer considered Arch Development Corporation as an experiment and wasn't comfortable continuing as general partner of a venture fund so it proposed that Arch Development Corporation would focus on licensing and business development of technologies while capital raising will be done outside the university . In 1992, Lazarus along with Booth Graduate students, Clint Bybee, Keith Crandell and Bob Nelsen left the university to set up Arch Venture Partners as an independent firm to raise capital.

The firm mainly invests in companies that are in the biotechnology, semiconductors and computing fields.

ArchVenture Partners is headquartered in Chicago with additional offices in Seattle, San Francisco and Dublin.

On June 10, 2018, Lazarus passed away and the firm's management was succeeded by the other co-founders.
