= FOR-U Smart Freight =

Chinese logistics company

- Native name
- Traditional Chinese: 福佑卡車
- Simplified Chinese: 福佑卡车
- Industry: Online freight
- Founded: March 2015
- Headquarters: Beijing
- Key people: Dandan Shan (founder, CEO)
- Revenue: ▲CN¥3.6 billion (2020)
- Website: www.for-u.com

FOR-U Smart Freight (previously Fuyoukache, also spelled Fuyou Kache; Chinese: 福佑卡车), or ForU Trucking, also known as ForU Worldwide, or simply as FOR-U, is a China-based road freight transport platform founded by Dandan Shan in March 2015. It provides long-haul trucking logistics services to enterprises and third-party logistics firms through web and mobile app.

Invested by GLP, ZhenFund, and Legend Capital, it focuses on the trucking logistics industry. On March 1, 2021, ForU Trucking completed the brand upgrade and released the new name "FOR-U Smart Freight". The company filed an application for listing with the SEC on May 13, 2021, and plans to list on the NASDAQ, with Goldman Sachs, UBS and CICC appointed as its joint bookrunners.

== History ==
FOR-U Smart Freight initially started in Nanjing. In December 2018, it completed a Series D financing round totaling $170 million, led by BOCGI and Matrix Partners China.

FOR-U Smart Freight's revenue in 2020 reached ¥3.6 billion ($544.3 million). In Q1 2021, the firm generated revenue of ¥1.183 billion.

In March 2021, FOR-U Smart Freight signed on to UN Women's WEPs to mark International Women's Day 2021.
