= Nova Founders Capital =

British venture capital firm and business incubator

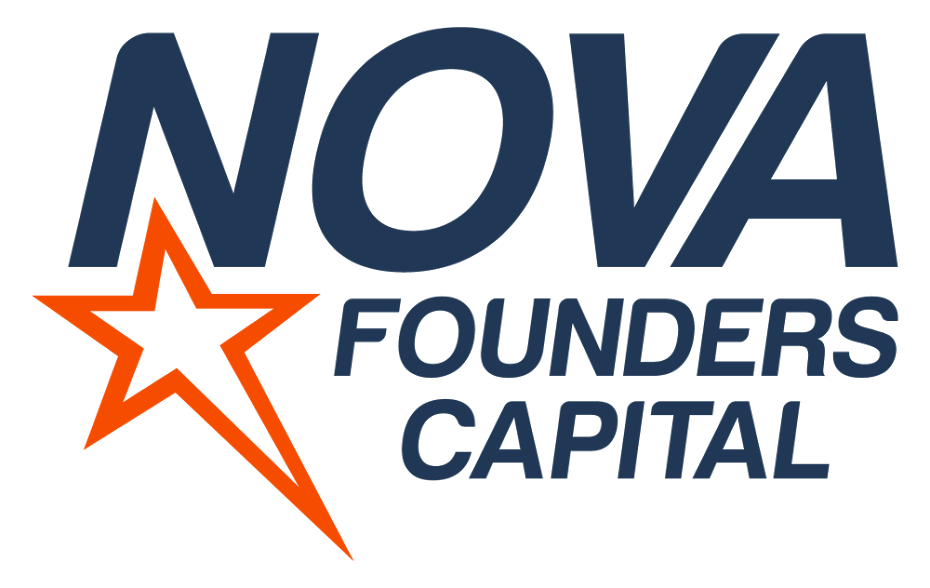
- Type: Private
- Industry: Venture capital
- Founded: 2012
- Founder: Mads Faurholt-Jorgensen, Raphael Strauch, Stefan Bruun
- Headquarters: London
- Number of employees: 5-10
- Website: www.novafounders.com

Nova Founders Capital is a London-based venture capital firm and business incubator specialising in financial technology and other internet technologies related to financial services. It was founded in 2012. It has since founded some twenty ventures globally, including financial comparison platforms CompareAsiaGroup, CompareEuropeGroup, and Coru; POS financing platform Vendigo; and formerly digital marketing agency Lion & Lion.

== History ==
Nova Founders Capital was founded by Mads Faurholt-Jorgensen, Raphael Strauch, and Stefan Bruun. The founding team met each other in Asia-Pacific, initially to launch operations of Groupon, later becoming global partners at Rocket Internet. While at Rocket, they oversaw the launch of Internet companies like online retailers Zalora and Lazada, and online meal delivery service foodpanda. At the same time, they saw the potential in taking active ownership of startup companies, particularly those involved in financial technology.

On September 18, 2014, Nova Founders Capital secured major funding through the Pacific Century Group, headed by Richard Li, the son of Hong Kong businessman Li Ka-shing. The Pacific Century Group invested $50 million in Nova to help it launch online financial services companies, on the belief that this industry was the last big Internet frontier. Following this funding round, more core team members were relocated to Hong Kong, where the company has one of its two head offices, the second of which is based in Mayfair, London, UK. In addition, Nova has led fundraising rounds for other companies, including a seed investment round for German/Swiss/Austrian e-invoicing platform Crossinx and Series A and B rounds for financial comparison platform CompareAsiaGroup—which gained significant traction prior to funding. At CompareAsiaGroup's Series B funding round a total of $50,000,000 was raised.

As of August 2018, Nova Founders Capital currently has 20 companies in its portfolio.

Prior to an investment, the Nova Founders team decides where the potential funds should be allocated, usually falling into three categories: building, investing in or acquiring companies. Although Nova Founders Capital officially is considered a venture capital firm, most of the investments are channeled into building new business from scratch. When investing, Nova Founders limits the number of investments it makes in a given year, to ensure that the team can continue to add significant value operationally.

== Partners and portfolio ==
The companies generally included in Nova Founders Capital's portfolio operate in a number of fields, though since 2014 they have been oriented towards banking, insurance and consumer finance products.

=== CompareAsiaGroup ===
CompareAsiaGroup is a localized financial comparison platform. In 2017, CompareAsiaGroup, received a total of US$50 million in new funding from investors. The new funding was led by International Finance Corp (IFC), a unit of World Bank while the other investors were Alibaba Entrepreneurs Fund, SBI Group and H&Q Utrust, as well as existing investors Goldman Sachs Investment Partners VC and Growth Equity, Nova Founders Capital, ACE & Company and Route 66 Ventures.

=== CompareEuropeGroup ===
CompareEuropeGroup is a financial comparison platform.

=== ComparaJá.pt ===
ComparaJá.pt is an online platform for aggregating, comparing and analyzing financial products and services. The Portuguese fintech was founded in 2015 in partnership with Nova Founders Capital and belongs to the CompareEuropeGroup.

=== Lion & Lion ===
Lion & Lion is a digital advertising agency specialising in online marketing campaigns and digital advertising solutions. By late 2016 Lion & Lion acquired by the Japanese Septeni Holdings for an undisclosed USD double-digit million amount and the company is therefore no longer a part of Nova Founders Capital's portfolio.

=== Pricefox ===
Pricefox is a price comparison online platform for financial services in Greece. Pricefox is backed by Antenna Group and CompareEuropeGroup, part of Nova Founders Capital.
