= TechOperators =

American venture capital firm

- Type: Early Stage Technology Venture Capital Firm
- Founded: 2008
- Headquarters: Atlanta, US
- Key people: Dave Gould, Partner; Glenn McGonnigle, Partner; Said Mohammadioun, Partner; Thomas E. Noonan, Partner; Tom McNeight, Partner; Bill Jones, VP; Daniel Ingevaldson, VP; Patrick Taylor, VP
- Website: http://www.techoperators.com

TechOperators is an early stage venture capital firm focused on cybersecurity and B2B software. It is based in Atlanta, Georgia, U.S., and was founded in 2008.

== Company overview ==
TechOperators was established in 2008 to focus on funding "early-stage firms too small and risky to attract traditional VC dollars and too big for angel investors" and is now investing out of its third fund. Led by veteran technology entrepreneurs and executives David Gould, Glenn McGonnigle, Said Mohammadioun, and Tom Noonan, the firm provides early stage capital financing from under $1m to $5 million. TechOperators takes an active role in their investments providing not only investment capital, but also applying their operational knowledge.

== Team ==
- Dave Gould — Former chairman and CEO of Atlanta-based software maker Witness Systems Inc., which was acquired by Verint Systems Inc. in 2007.
- Glenn McGonnigle — Former chairman and CEO of Atlanta-based VistaScape Security Systems Corp., which was acquired by Siemens Building Technologies Inc. in 2006.
- Said Mohammadioun — Founded Atlanta software firm Samna Corp., which Lotus Development Corp. bought in 1990 for $65 million. Former CEO and chairman of Synchrologic Inc., which was sold to Intellisync Corp. in 2003 for about $85 million. Nokia Corp. bought Intellisync in 2006.
- Tom Noonan — Co-founded Internet Security Systems Inc., which IBM Corp. acquired for $1.5 billion in 2006.
- Bill Jones — Former CEO of Orderly and former product management executive at Air2Web and Synchrologic, Inc.
- Daniel Ingevaldson — Co-Founder of Endgame, Inc., acquired by Elastic NV in 2019. Previous CTO of Easy Solutions, Inc., acquired by Cyxtera in 2019.

== Funds and Investments ==
TechOperators raised $100m for its third and current fund. Notable investments include Automox, Polarity, Tala Security, Todyl, Scytale (acquired by HPE) and Kyck Global.

TechOperators Fund II includes investments in Springbot, Phantom Cyber (acquired by Splunk), Flashpoint and Ionic Security (acquired by Twilio).

TechOperators raised $30 million for its inaugural fund in 2008. In their first fund, TechOperators invested in Vocalocity, a VoIP company providing hosted pbx for small businesses, Immunet (acquired by Sourcefire) and JouleX (acquired by Cisco).
