= Cottonwood Technology Fund =

U.S. venture capital firm

- Type: Private
- Industry: Venture capital
- Founded: 2010; 16 years ago
- Founder: David Blivin
- Headquarters: Santa Fe, New Mexico, United States & Enschede, the Netherlands
- Area served: United States, Europe
- Products: Venture capital
- Website: www.cottonwood.vc

Cottonwood Technology Fund is a venture capital firm with offices in Santa Fe (New Mexico), Denver (Colorado) and Enschede, the Netherlands. It makes impact investments in deep tech, hardware and high tech. Cottonwood closed its third investment fund in 2020 and its fourth fund in 2025.

== History ==
Cottonwood Technology Fund was founded by David Blivin in 2010 in Santa Fe, New Mexico.

In 2014, Cottonwood expanded its operations to Europe. Its European headquarters is located on the innovation campus of the University of Twente in Enschede, the Netherlands. It is led by Alain le Loux, who is a former Member of the Executive Committee of Getronics PinkRoccade and has served as CEO of multiple startups.

In November 2020, Cottonwood announced the opening of its third investment fund. Investors in Cottonwood include Koninklijke KPN and Caterpillar.

== Investments ==
Cottonwood Technology Fund specializes in seed stage and early stage investments in private companies.

Its portfolio is mainly in photonics, electronics, advanced materials, quantum, nanotechnology, medical technology, advanced manufacturing, robotics, clean technology and the renewable energy transition.

Cottonwood has invested in over 20 companies since 2010, including Skorpios Technologies, BayoTech, Sarcos Robotics, Infinitum Electric, Keiron Printing Technlogies, Orange Quantum Systems, Q*Bird, Reyedar, Sencure, SoundEnergy, OPNT and Flexiramics.

In 2019, their portfolio company Exagen Inc. exited in an initial public offering (Nasdaq: XGN).

== See also ==
- Private equity
- Venture capital
- Deep tech
- High tech
