= Elevate Capital =

American venture capital firm

Elevate Capital LLC
- Type: Privately Held
- Industry: Venture capital
- Founded: 2016
- Headquarters: Beaverton, Oregon
- Key people: Nitin Rai, Founder and Managing Director; Robin Jones, Venture Partner; Mike Choi, Executive Partner; Raghu Raghavan, Executive Partner
- Website: www.elevate.vc

Elevate Capital (Elevate Capital LLC) is a privately owned venture capital firm based in Portland, Oregon, that focuses on early-stage investments in startup companies and particularly those companies led by women, minorities, and veterans. The firm manages the Elevate Capital Fund that invests in early-stage companies and the Elevate Inclusion Fund that invests in startups run by women and minority entrepreneurs.

== History ==
Elevate Capital was founded in January 2016 by Managing Director Nitin Rai. Also in January 2016, the Portland Development Council (now Prosper Portland) selected Elevate Capital as the management firm for its publicly financed investment fund whose stated goal was to improve diversity among Oregon startups. In August 2016, Elevate Capital made its first six investments in startups including Blendoor, Goumikids, Hubb, I.T. Aire, RFPIO, and Versi.

In April 2017, Elevate Capital invested $500,000 in Medical Magnesium as part of the Rice Business Plan Competition held at Rice University. In July 2018, one of Elevate Capital's investments, RFPIO, secured a $25 million funding round from private equity firm K1 Investment Management. This resulted in an early exit for Elevate Capital and produced significant returns. On October 12, 2018, Elevate Capital hosted the Elevate Inclusion Summit at Portland Center Stage at the Armory to connect women founders and minority entrepreneurs with investors.

In January 2026, Elevate announced $1.6 million investment in Overwatch Imaging, Clean Haus, PortalSphere, StrateSea, and Osheru under the Small Business Credit Initiative.

== See also ==
- List of companies based in Oregon
