= Oriental Fortune Capital =

Chinese venture capital firm

Shenzhen Oriental Fortune Capital Investment Management Co., Ltd.
- Trade name: OFC
- Native name: 深圳市东方富海投资管理股份有限公司
- Company type: Private
- Industry: Venture capital
- Founded: 2006; 20 years ago
- Founder: Chen Wei
- Headquarters: Shenzhen, Guangdong, China
- AUM: US$4.8 billion (2024)
- Number of employees: 150 (2024)
- Website: www.ofcapital.com

Oriental Fortune Capital (OFC; Chinese: 东方富海; pinyin: Dōngfāng Fùhǎi) is a Chinese venture capital (VC) firm that is headquartered in Shenzhen.

== Background ==
OFC was co-founded in 2006 by Chen Wei who was previously the President of Shenzhen Capital Group (SCGC). When departing SCGC, Chen persuaded several of his colleagues to join him as general partners of OFC. The firm originally had three employees. Since its establishment, OFC has been based in the same building in Futian, Shenzhen which is said to have good feng shui.

By early 2007, OFC recruited several limited partners (LPs) who were mostly real estate developers and raised 320 million yuan for its debut fund.

When OFC first started its operation in 2007, OFC focused on pre-IPO stage projects which delivered immediate results to impress the LPs. During the 2008 financial crisis, OFC took on more early-stage projects as rapid exits became unrealistic under the prevailing economic conditions. The profitability of the project came first in priority over the industry it was in.

In May 2010, it was reported that OFC was raising US$100 million for its first offshore fund. The purpose of raising the fund was to diversify its investor base and portfolio.

By the end of 2010, 20% of OFC's portfolio companies were in their early stages, and around 40% each in the growth and the pre-IPO stages. To accommodate the new strategy, OFC preferred to set a VC fund's lifetime to around five to seven years and an investment cycle to two to three years, in contrast to the shorter life span of its peers. As a result, OFC could keep the right balance of different projects while allowing adequate time to improve the performance of early stage investments.

By 2011, OFC had invested in over 60 companies with 7 of them being publicly listed. OFC's investment thesis revolved around the opportunities created by the rapid development of the economy, on the back of fast growing innovative businesses. The firm's investments focused on five major industries and within each industry, the firm attempted to cover the entire value chain from upstream to downstream activities. Such a specialized approach allowed OFC to differentiate itself from its peers who pursued a more generalized approach. OFC also paid close attention to state policy to know what sectors would become popular such as renewable energy. OFC takes a market oriented approach and has very stringent procedures regarding documentation when it comes to investment making decisions.

In 2022, despite difficulties in fundraising, OFC still managed to raise 7 billion yuan and invest in 46 projects throughout the year. During that year, OFC established a sub fund under the China SME Development Fund.
