= Binary Capital =

- Type: Limited liability company
- Industry: Venture capital
- Founded: 2014
- Defunct: 2018
- Headquarters: San Francisco, California, United States
- Total assets: $300 million
- Website: www.binarycap.com

Binary Capital was an early stage venture capital firm based in San Francisco. The firm focuses on early-stage consumer technology companies. The founders' previous investment experience included roles at General Catalyst Partners, Benchmark Capital, Lightspeed Venture Partners, and Bain Capital Ventures.

Binary's first fund managed $125 million. Their second fund was slated to manage $175 million, although in the wake of co-founder Justin Caldbeck's sexual harassment scandal, the fund's limited partners voted to shut it down.

In June 2017, Caldbeck took an indefinite leave of absence following allegations of unwanted sexual advances by several female startup founders. The firm issued the following statement, as reported by The Information.

In a statement, Mr. Caldbeck said, "I strongly deny The Information’s attacks on my character. The fact is, I have always enjoyed respectful relationships with female founders, business partners, and investors."

Binary issued a statement that said the notion Mr. Caldbeck had "engaged in improper behavior with female entrepreneurs" was "false." Binary said that while the information had "found a few examples which show that Justin has in the past occasionally dated or flirted with women he met in a professional capacity, let’s be clear: there is no evidence that Justin did anything illegal and there is no evidence that any of his investing decisions were affected by his social interests."

Days later, Caldbeck issued a statement no longer denying the allegations and publicly apologizing, starting off by saying "The past 24 hours have been the darkest of my life."

Following this announcement due to pressure from the media and Limited Partners in the fund, Caldbeck resigned as did new Partner Matt Mazzeo from Lowercase Capital.

Jonathan Teo, the last remaining Managing Partner of the fund, issued a statement on Facebook, acknowledging that he heard rumors of Caldbeck's harassment of women from the past and had not acted on it. "I have known Justin in a professional context for many years. I have also heard rumors about him from the past. In the second year of our partnership, I had learned of some bad behavior from my partner, but it was evidenced to me that it happened prior to his time at Binary. And I kept my word that his past is the past and I would put it behind me. I love that there is something I can learn from everyone, and I always look for that. The world is quick to judge. Rightly so. There is so much to be outraged about in the current world we live in and this allows us to drive massive change and move on to the next issue to be outraged about. Because there is so much that is damaged in the world."

Although Bloomberg reported that the fund would shut down, it remains in operation with Mr. Teo as Managing Partner.

In March 2018, venture capital firm Lerer Hippeau took over the management of Binary’s first fund. The firm completed takeover of Binary’s second fund in April 2018.
