= Plum Ventures =

Chinese venture capital firm

Ningbo Plum Angel Investment Management Co. Ltd.
- Trade name: Plum Ventures
- Native name: 宁波梅花天使投资管理有限公司
- Company type: Private
- Industry: Venture capital
- Founded: 2014; 12 years ago
- Founders: Wu Shichun
- Headquarters: Ningbo, Zhejiang, China
- AUM: US$1.5 billion (2024)
- Website: www.plumventures.cn

Plum Ventures (Chinese: 梅花创投; pinyin: Méihuā Chuàngtóu) is a Chinese venture capital (VC) firm that focuses on angel investing and early stage companies. It is headquartered in Ningbo, Zhejiang.

As of 2024, Plum Ventures has invested in over 600 companies.

== Background ==
In 2014, Wu Shichun founded Plum Ventures. Wu was an entrepreneur who had founded companies such as TQ and KuXun. Wu sensed that China needed new set of VC organizations to serve growing businesses and entrepreneurs so he founded a VC firm instead of another company.

According to Wu, Plum Ventures generally invests in founders which have three characteristics: poor, smart, and have desire. Historically Plum Ventures invests in companies related to technology. Due to market cycles moving very quickly, Plum Ventures takes a fast approach to investments. Plum Ventures completes a fund every 1-1.5 years with the investment team looking at more than 5,000 projects and selecting 100 of them to invest in. For one project, Wu drafted an investment agreement with a founder in less than 10 minutes.

In May 2019, Wu stated on The New York Times that the Trump tariffs would affect Plum Ventures' portfolio companies that rely on the US to do business. As a result, going forward Plum Ventures would have to invest in companies that focus only on the Chinese market.

In February 2024, National Business Daily noted that a legal letter representing a limited partner (LP) that was addressed to Plum Ventures was circulating on social media. The letter complained about the treatment the LP was getting from Plum Ventures and how there was a lack of communication and transparency.
