= ShopBack =

Online affiliate company based in Singapore

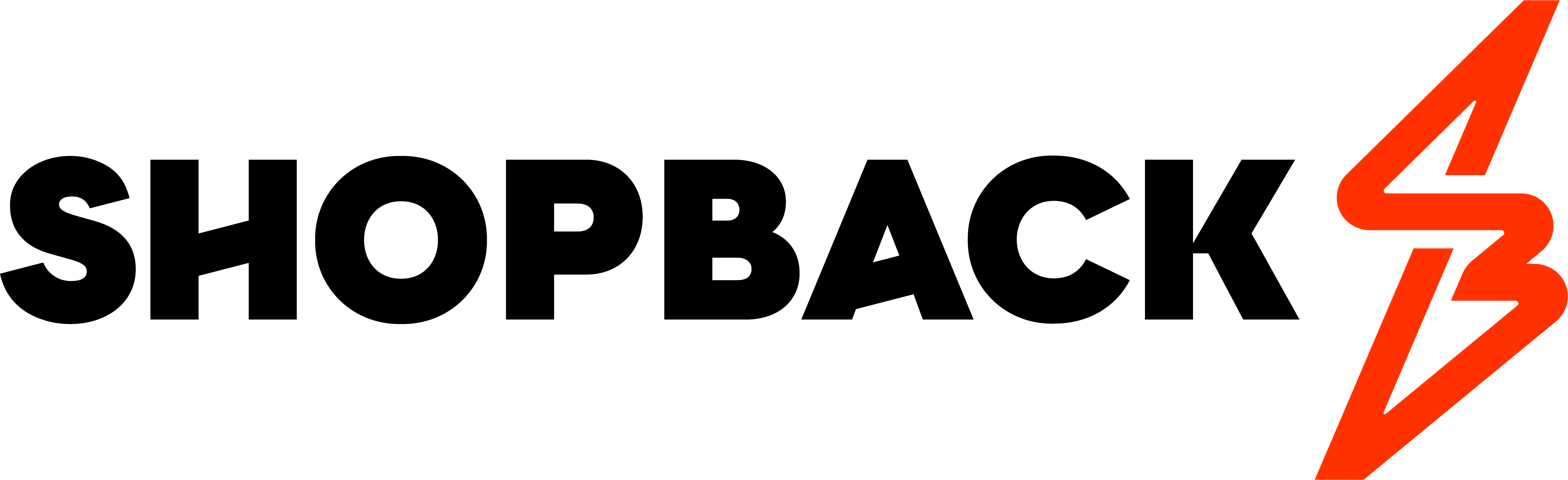
- Industry: E-Commerce, Online coupons
- Founded: August 2014
- Founders: Henry Chan; Joel Leong; Lai Shanru; Josephine Chow
- Headquarters: Singapore,
- Area served: List: Australia; Indonesia; Malaysia; Philippines; Singapore; South Korea; Taiwan; Thailand; Vietnam
- Services: Cashback

ShopBack is a cashback reward program available across the Asia-Pacific (APAC). It allows online shoppers to receive a small percentage of their purchases on the platform, paid for through affiliate programs by the merchant. The platform also provides coupons, voucher codes, product comparison, QR code payment, and most recently, buy-now-pay-later. It has 30 million users.

It is partnered with firms such as Amazon, Booking.com, ASOS, Zalora, Woolworths.com.au, Lazada, Uber, Grab, Shopee, Tokopedia, GoWabi, Blibli, Alibaba, and eBay.

ShopBack is currently available in 13 countries including the United States, Australia, Indonesia, Germany, Malaysia, Philippines, Singapore, Hong Kong, South Korea, Taiwan, Thailand, Vietnam, and New Zealand.

== History ==
ShopBack’s founding team was previously from Zalora.

In April 2020, ShopBack announced the acquisition of Ebates Korea.

On 17 September 2020, ShopBack suffered a data breach. They notified customers 8 days later on 25 September 2020.

== Funding ==
ShopBack raised over US$500,000 in seed funding shortly after founding, followed by a US$600,000 round in March 2015 led by East Ventures and Accel-X. The company subsequently raised approximately US$15 million across additional early rounds before its Series A in 2017.

In November 2017, ShopBack closed a US$25 million Series A round led by Credit Saison, with participation from new investors Blue Sky, AppWorks, Intouch Holdings, Aetius Capital, and 33 Capital, and returning investors SoftBank Ventures Korea, Singtel Innov8, Qualgro, and East Ventures. The round brought total funding to approximately US$40 million. Today, ShopBack averages an order every 2 seconds, with an annualised sales figure of over US$500 million and 5 million users in early 2018.

In April 2019, ShopBack announced that it has closed a US$45 million round led by new investors Rakuten Capital and EV Growth, bringing their total funding to US$85 million. The investment will see Amit Patel, who leads Rakuten-owned cashback service Ebates, and Willson Cuaca (Managing Partner of EV Growth and East Ventures), join the board.

== Acquisitions ==
In May 2018, ShopBack acquired Singapore-based personal finance platform Seedly. ShopBack subsequently divested Seedly to CompareAsiaGroup in October 2020.

In November 2021, ShopBack acquired 100 percent of Singapore-based buy-now-pay-later platform hoolah, marking its entry into financial services.

== ShopFest ==
ShopBack ShopFest is an annual event hosted in partnership between e-commerce brands and ShopBack. Across the APAC region, ShopFest puts together major shopping events during the year end sale season.

ShopFest starts in September (November for Australia) and lasts for 4 months till December. Regionally, ShopBack holds the 9.9 Sales, 10.10 Sales, 11.11 Sales, Black Friday Cyber Monday Sales and 12.12 Sales. Other highlights of ShopFest includes MyCyberSale in Malaysia (27 Sep - 3 Oct), the 12.12 Hari Belanja Online Nasional (Harbolnas) in Indonesia, and Click Frenzy in Australia (12 - 13 Nov)
