= HBM Healthcare Investments =

Swiss Venture Capital Firm

HBM Healthcare Investments AG
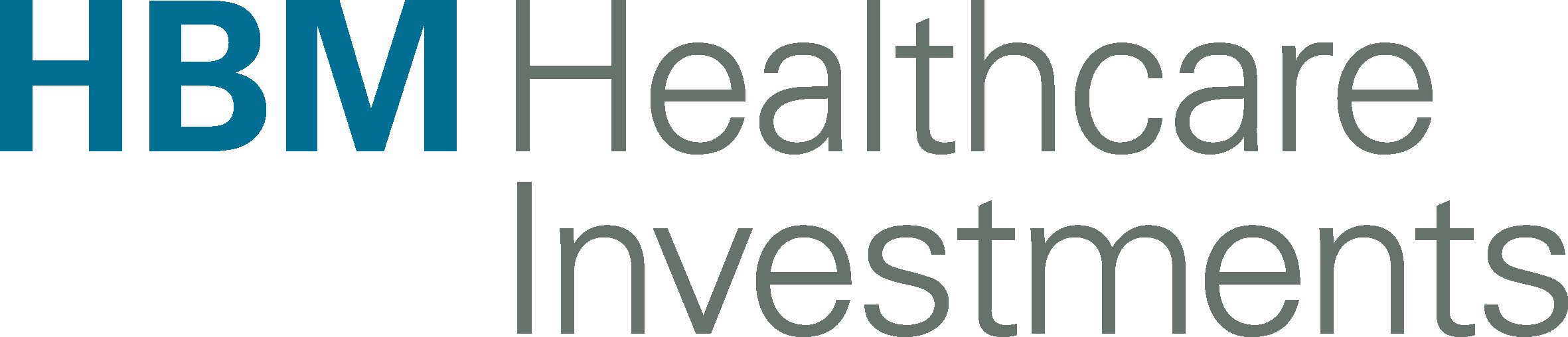
- Company type: Public
- Traded as: HBMN.SW (SIX Swiss Exchange)
- Industry: Venture capital
- Founded: 2001
- Founder: Henri Bernard Meier
- Headquarters: Zug, Switzerland
- Area served: Worldwide
- Key people: Hans Peter Hasler (Chairman)
- AUM: $1.9B
- Website: www.hbmhealthcare.com

HBM Healthcare Investments is a publicly traded Swiss investment and venture capital firm focusing on emerging technologies in the global healthcare sector. Within healthcare their focus is predominantly in biotechnology, medical technology, diagnostics, therapeutics and digital health.

A 2022 article in Swiss daily Luzerner Zeitung profiled HBM and interviewed its CEO, and described the company’s investment strategy as focused on early-stage but post-seed round opportunities.

Founded in July 2001 as HBM Bioventures AG by former Roche Chief Financial Officer Henri B. Meier who was its first Chairperson of the Board. A Handelszeitung article from 2020 described Meier's goal when founding the company as to profit from the "thesis" that from the 2000s onwards "Big Pharma is doing less and less research and development itself and is instead acquiring promising biotech companies" In an analysis of how HBM was put together, Swiss magazine Finanz und Wirtschaft described how he was able to raise almost 500 million Swiss Francs for the company launch. HBM is based in Zug and managed by HBM Partners. HBM acquired rival Swiss VC International BM Biomedicine in 2005. The firm went public on the SIX Swiss exchange in 2008.

HBM invests primarily in U.S., European, Chinese and (on a smaller scale) Indian firms and reported a net asset value of just over 1.7 billion Swiss Francs (approximately 1.9 billion U.S. dollars) at end of March 2024 It is often compared by economic-themed media to fellow Swiss healthcare investment firm BB Biotech.

Though headquartered in Zug, the firm also has senior investment analysts and other staff based in New York and Hong Kong.
