= Oriza Holdings =

China-based investment firm

Suzhou Oriza Holdings Corporation
- Native name: 蘇州元禾控股股份有限公司
- Formerly: China-Singapore Suzhou Industrial Park Ventures; Suzhou Venture Group
- Company type: State-owned enterprise
- Industry: Investment management
- Founded: 28 November 2001; 24 years ago
- Headquarters: Suzhou, Jiangsu, China
- Key people: Liu Chengwei (Chairman)
- Products: Venture Capital; Private equity Private credit Fund of funds
- AUM: US$14 billion (2023)
- Owner: Suzhou Industrial Park Administration Committee
- Parent: Suzhou Industrial Park Economic Development Co., Ltd (59.98%)
- Website: www.oriza.com

Oriza Holdings (Oriza) (Chinese: 元禾控股; pinyin: Yuánhé Kònggǔ) is a Chinese investment firm founded in 2001. The firm is the investment arm of Suzhou Industrial Park. It provides equity and debt financing and seeks to invest in companies based in the technology, healthcare and materials sector. It also has a fund of funds strategy that invests in other venture capital and private equity funds.

== Background ==
Oriza traces its roots back to 1994 when Singapore and China established the Suzhou Industrial Park which is also known as the China–Singapore Suzhou Industrial Park.

On 28 November 2001, China-Singapore Suzhou Industrial Park Ventures (CSVC) was founded as an investment firm that could funnel capital to the technology startup companies at the park.

On 28 September 2007, the firm underwent restructuring and the entity known as Suzhou Venture Group (SVG) was formed.

In November 2012, the firm was renamed to Oriza Holdings.

In 2015, the firm set up Oriza Ventures, a Silicon Valley unit that invests in American startup companies.

Although the firm is state-owned it claims that it takes on an entirely market-oriented approach in identifying its investment targets. While it maintains good relationships with local governments, it will refuse to invest in projects which could jeopardize the firm's reputation.

== Notable deals ==
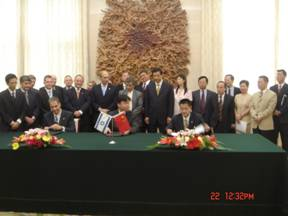
Signing ceremony launching Infinity-CSVC China Fund, 22 June 2004

In 2004, the firm partnered with the Infinity Group to establish a joint Israel-China fund of US$15 million known as the Infinity-CSVC China Fund.

In 2008, the firm launched a second joint Israel-China fund of US$300 million known as the Infinity-I China fund.

In December 2010, the firm partnered with China Development Bank to launch Guochuang Fund of Funds, a US$9 billion state-backed fund of funds to support China's venture capital and private equity firms.

In 2013, a consortium that included, Oriza, CITIC Capital and China Merchants Group acquired a 24.5% stake in SF Express for 8 billion RMB. After SF express went had a large initial public offering in 2017, it was estimated that Oriza could have obtained a 10 times gain.

In November 2015, Oriza, Tencent and Alibaba Group contributed US1.6 billion to CMC Holdings, an investment platform launched by Li Ruigang and his firm China Media Capital. In December 2015, CMC holdings would acquire a 13% stake in City Football Group, the owner of Manchester City F.C. for US$400 million giving Oriza a stake of the club.

In October 2020, Oriza and CDH Investments purchased US$219 million worth of CSI Solar shares from its parent, Canadian Solar so CSI Solar could qualify for a planned carve out initial public offering in China.

In 2022, it was reported that the China Integrated Circuit Industry Investment Fund known as the "Big Fund" had invested into Oriza. The fund was under investigation for suspected corruption and bribery.
