= Golden Gate Ventures =

Southeast Asian venture capital firm

- Type: Private
- Industry: Venture capital
- Founded: 2011; 15 years ago
- Headquarters: Singapore
- Area served: Southeast Asia
- AUM: $300 million (2025)
- Website: www.goldengate.vc

Golden Gate Ventures is a Singaporean venture capital firm, founded in 2011 by Vinnie Lauria, Jeffrey Paine, and Paul Bragiel that invests in Southeast Asia. The company is headquartered in Singapore, with offices in Jakarta, Hanoi, and Ho Chi Minh City.

Golden Gate Ventures invests in early-stage tech startups. Its investments range span social commerce, healthtech, entertainment, marketplaces, agritech, entertainment, and fintech.

== History ==
Golden Gate Ventures was accepted into the Singapore Government's Technology Incubation Scheme in 2013.

In 2022, Golden Gate Ventures opened offices in Hanoi and Ho Chi Minh City, Vietnam.

In 2024, Golden Gate Ventures launched a fund focused on the Middle East and North Africa (MENA).
