= Rothenberg Ventures =

Venture Capital firm

- Type: Private
- Industry: Venture capital
- Founded: 2012
- Founder: Mike Rothenberg
- Headquarters: 1062 Folsom Street; San Francisco, California, USA

Rothenberg Ventures, known briefly as Frontier Technology Venture Capital, was an American venture capital firm based in San Francisco, California, and founded in 2012 by Mike Rothenberg, who was later convicted of fraud and money laundering.

It had invested in more than 100 companies, including Bustle, Robinhood, Revel Systems, and SpaceX, and focused its investments on virtual reality and other frontier technologies. As of January 2021, the firm's status with the California Franchise Tax Board is "forfeited".

According to the U.S. Securities and Exchange Commission, Mike Rothenberg "orchestrated a years-long, massive fraud and posed a substantial risk of loss to investors, with $18.8 million misappropriated." Mike Rothenberg resigned from the firm in October 2018 and agreed to be barred from the securities industry with a right to reapply after five years.

On December 20, 2019, Judge Jon S. Tigar for the U.S. District Court for the Northern District of California ordered Mike Rothenberg to pay disgorgement of $18,776,800, prejudgment interest of $3,663,323, and a civil penalty of $9,000,000.

In June 2020, Mike Rothenberg was arrested and charged with 23 federal felony charges, facing decades in prison if convicted.

Judge Tigar split the 23 charges into two trials, one for charges 1-2 and the other for charges 3-23. The jury failed to reach a verdict in the first trial. In the second trial, which ended in November 16, 2023, he was found guilty of 21 felony charges. Judge Tigar scheduled Rothenberg’s sentencing hearing for March 1, 2024.

== History ==
Founded in 2012, the firm began with a $5 million seed fund raised by Rothenberg.

On November 4, 2013, data research company Mattermark awarded Rothenberg Ventures' portfolio its highest average ranking.

Rothenberg Ventures built the world's first virtual-reality startup accelerator, River, and has invested in 30-plus VR companies to date, including AltSpaceVR, Fove, and Matterport.

In May 2014 Rothenberg Ventures hosted Founder Field Day at Oracle Park, then known as AT&T Park. Hundreds of founders were selected, given customized schedules, and attended fireside chats by industry luminaries in Rothenberg Venture's network. The day ended in a Third Eye Blind concert at The Fillmore. The day was free for all attendees. The firm hosts 8-10 curated networking events a month. The event was the subject of a Harvard Business School case. The case study was covered in a TechCrunch article titled "For HBS students, a case study in what not to do."

== Controversies ==
Rothenberg Ventures became the subject of an investigation by the U.S. Securities and Exchange Commission in 2016, and multiple lawsuits have been filed against the firm. In 2018, the SEC charged Mike Rothenberg and Rothenberg Ventures with fraud. In July 2016, the U.S. Securities and Exchange Commission (SEC) opened an investigation into Rothenberg Ventures' financial management practices, centering on allegations of excessive executive compensation without investors' knowledge. Media reports have cited bank fraud, breach of fiduciary duty, whistleblower retaliation, and wire fraud as possible areas of investigation, which the SEC has not confirmed.

Several executives left the company during July and August 2016, including Fran Hauser, who had served as a venture partner since May 2014. Multiple lawsuits have been filed against the company, including one by a former chief of staff alleging Rothenberg Ventures owed payments to 50 employees, and another by a former chief financial officer who claimed he was never paid back for more than $100,000 in business expenses. Rothenberg was ordered to pay its former CFO $166,000 in damages on October 30, 2017.

Mike Rothenberg has been accused of investing $5 million from Rothenberg Ventures' second and third funds in his own startup company, River Studios, a VR production house established in May 2015. River Studios' first contract was with Birchbox, and the company has subsequently created VR content for Björk, Coldplay, the Denver Broncos, and the Sacramento Kings. A third party forensic accounting firm was able to reconcile the finances and confirmed that they were consistent with the agreements with the LPs. In 2017, Transcend VR sued Mike Rothenberg on allegations of breach of contract and settled out of court.

The company's name was briefly changed to Frontier Tech Ventures, from September 2016 to February 2017. In October 2016, San Francisco's Planning Department received notification that the firm was operating from a building not properly permitted for use as general office space. The property, which was reportedly purchased in 2015 for $4.5 million, also housed co-working space for startup and portfolio companies, including Liquidspace. In late 2016, Rothenberg Ventures was mentioned in year-end stories about corporate crises by Bloomberg Businessweek, Forbes, and Business Insider.

in 2018, Rothenberg filed a lawsuit against Silicon Valley Bank, which accuses them of negligence, deceit, fraud, and unfair business practices. The suit, which seeks a jury trial, alleges the bank "created the false appearance that the management company and Mr. Rothenberg had wrongfully misappropriated millions in investor funds." The firm intended to use the deposited fees as collateral for a loan, which it wanted to complete before the end of the year, according to the suit. On Dec. 23, Rothenberg instructed the bank to set up an account owned by the 2015 investment fund for that purpose, according to the lawsuit, and the bank did so on the same day. The bank, however, didn't have enough time to complete its customary three-week internal control process before the year-end, the suit says. So it took a shortcut, the suit says, creating a new account owned by the management company without telling Rothenberg.

On August 20, 2018, the SEC charged Mike Rothenberg and Rothenberg Ventures with fraud. Rothenberg settled the charges without admitting guilt, and has stepped down from his position. As part of the settlement, Rothenberg does not admit guilt but has agreed to be barred from the brokerage and investment advisory business with a right to reapply after five years.

In August 2019, Deloitte completed a financial audit, resulting in the SEC seeking over $31m in penalties from Mike Rothenberg. In January 2020, Mike Rothenberg was ordered to pay $31.4 million to settle a court ruling favoring the SEC allegations. Rothenberg was found to have funneled millions of dollars from investors to support his flashy lifestyle, building a race car team, and to fund a virtual reality studio.

The Department of Justice's news release states: "Magistrate Judge Westmore ordered Rothenberg released on $250,000 bond pending the outcome of the case. Rothenberg’s next appearance was scheduled for August 27, 2020, at 10:30 a.m. The case is being prosecuted by the Special Prosecutions Section of the U.S. Attorney’s Office. The case is being investigated by the FBI and IRS Criminal Investigations."

In June 2020, Mike Rothenberg was arrested and charged with 23 federal felony fraud charges, facing decades in prison if convicted. Rotherberg was criminally charged by the US Federal District Attorney in 2022, but the jury failed to reach a verdict. In a new trial, which ended on November 16 2023, he was found guilty.
