= Fencepost =

A fencepost, fence post or fencing post is a vertical element upholding a fence.

Fencepost may also refer to:

- Steel fence post
- Tumblewheel, a movable fence post
- Fencepost error, a mathematical problem
- Peruvian fence post or Trichocereus macrogonus, a cactus plant

== See also ==
- Agricultural fencing
- Fencepost limestone
- Post (disambiguation)
- Post pounder, also called fence driver
- Roundpole fence
