= Stanchion =

Sturdy upright fixture that provides support for some other object

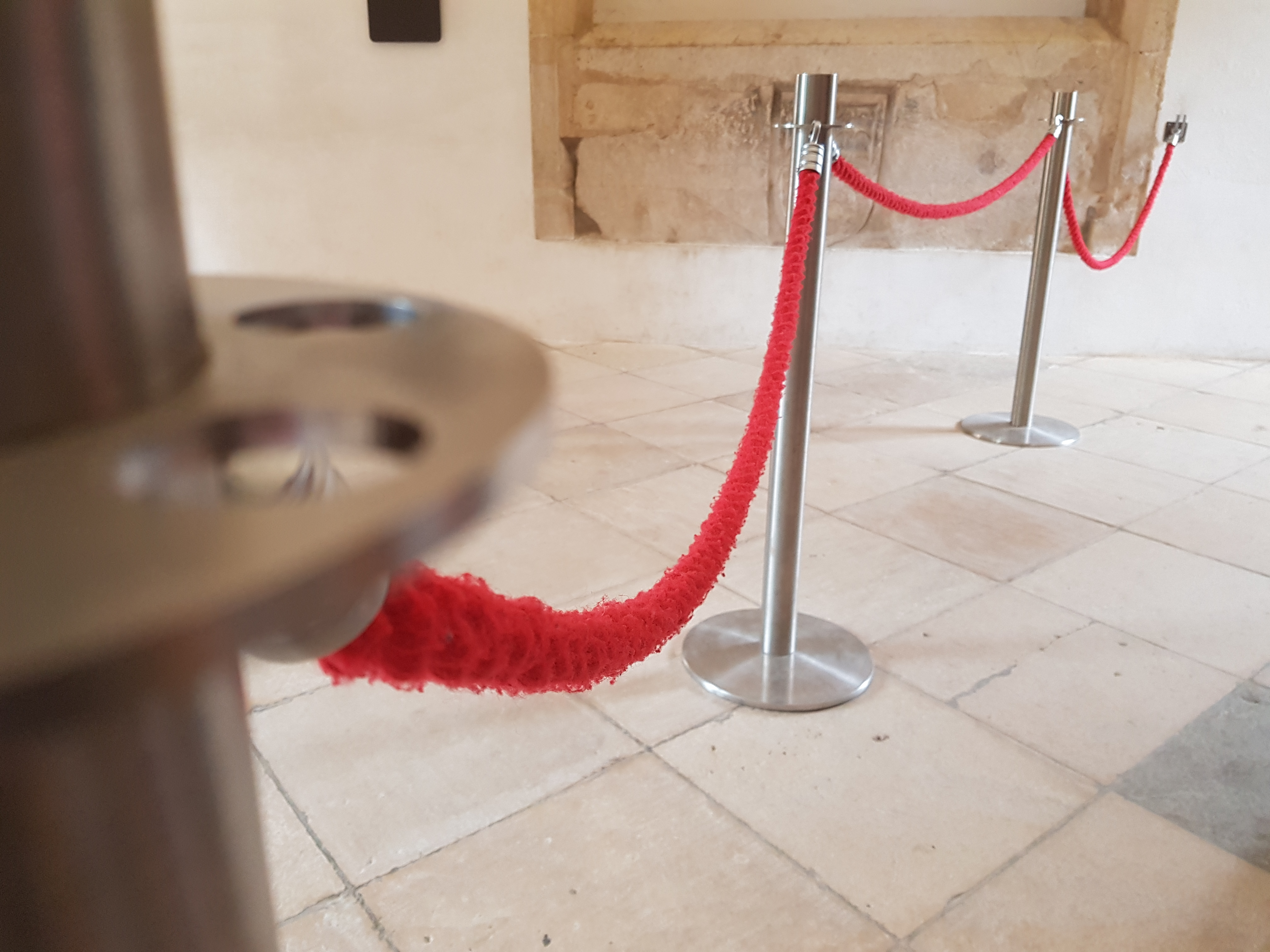
Stanchions and velvet rope

A stanchion (UK: /ˈstɑːnʃən/, /ˈstæn-/; US: /ˈstæn(t)ʃən/) is a sturdy upright fixture that provides support for some other object. It can be a permanent fixture.

== Types ==
In architecture, stanchions are the upright iron bars in windows that pass through the eyes of the saddle bars or horizontal irons to steady the leadlight. The French call the latter traverses, the stanchions montants, and the whole arrangement armature. Stanchions frequently finish with ornamental heads forged out of the iron.

Stanchions are also the metal supporting members of lighting mounted from a lower elevation. This includes the metal inclined member for mounting a streetlight to a telephone or power pole, and the dedicated metal vertical support of a self-supporting or bottom-fed streetlight. In this case, the stanchion pole may double as the raceway for the electrical feed to the lighting.

In industrial installations, walkway lighting may be mounted with a stanchion that is secured to a handrail. Stanchion lights are typically spaced 50 feet (15.24 m) along walkways, such as conveyor platforms.

Stanchions (balusters or bollards) are also the upright posts inserted into the ground or floor to protect the corner of a wall.

In event management a stanchion is an upright bar or post that includes or connects to retractable belts, velvet ropes, or plastic chains, sometimes in conjunction with wall-mounted barrier devices, barricades, and printed signage and often used for crowd control and engineering people-flow and construction-site safety.

== Uses ==
Stanchions are used for purposes including crowd control, queues, waiting lines, and management of large groups of people.

- Portable posts used to manage lines and queues.
  - Fixed posts with decorative ropes, custom-printed belts, or metal wires. Often available in single, double, and triple belt/wire configurations.
  - Retractable belt stanchions, often with a heavy low-profile base to offset possible trip hazard and stanchion tipping, and often also with a slowly retracting spring-operated belt mechanism for safety. (Some have a "Universal Belt End," allowing for connectivity between multiple makes.) In museums, such stanchions are used to protect items and remind visitors that they are not to be touched.
- Around construction work sites, conspicuous markers of hazardous areas. Stanchions used for this purpose usually have bright safety colors, like orange or yellow, and often come with attachments for safety signs, warning passersby of the danger in the area.
- Retracting belt barriers affixed to traffic cones with reflective print.
- Vertical supports for chains or ropes, as in marine applications, such as those for lifelines on yachts or boats.
  - Nautical stanchions
- Metal mounts securing the headrest to the seat in a car.
- In association football and other goal-based sports, horizontal or diagonal extensions to the goalposts that prevent the goal net from drooping.
- In military aircraft, vertical supports for troop seating temporarily installed in cargo aircraft.
- On board most buses and trams/subways, vertical supports to provide stability when passengers are standing. They are located throughout most city buses and are connected to seats, floor, roof, etc.
- The metal head bails in dairy barns that lock the cows in place while they are milked.
- The two lower members of a suspension bicycle fork that connect to the crown (also called fork legs).
- In river rafting, metal bars that hold the yokes for oars.
- In ice hockey, the posts used on the dasher boards to hold panes of glass in place. This is a common vernacular term in the sport, although in the industry, they are simply called posts.
- The upright part of the frame around a windscreen (the A pillar).
- In stores, a stanchion supplied by a manufacturer can be placed on the counter to display their product, such as candy.

=== Gallery ===
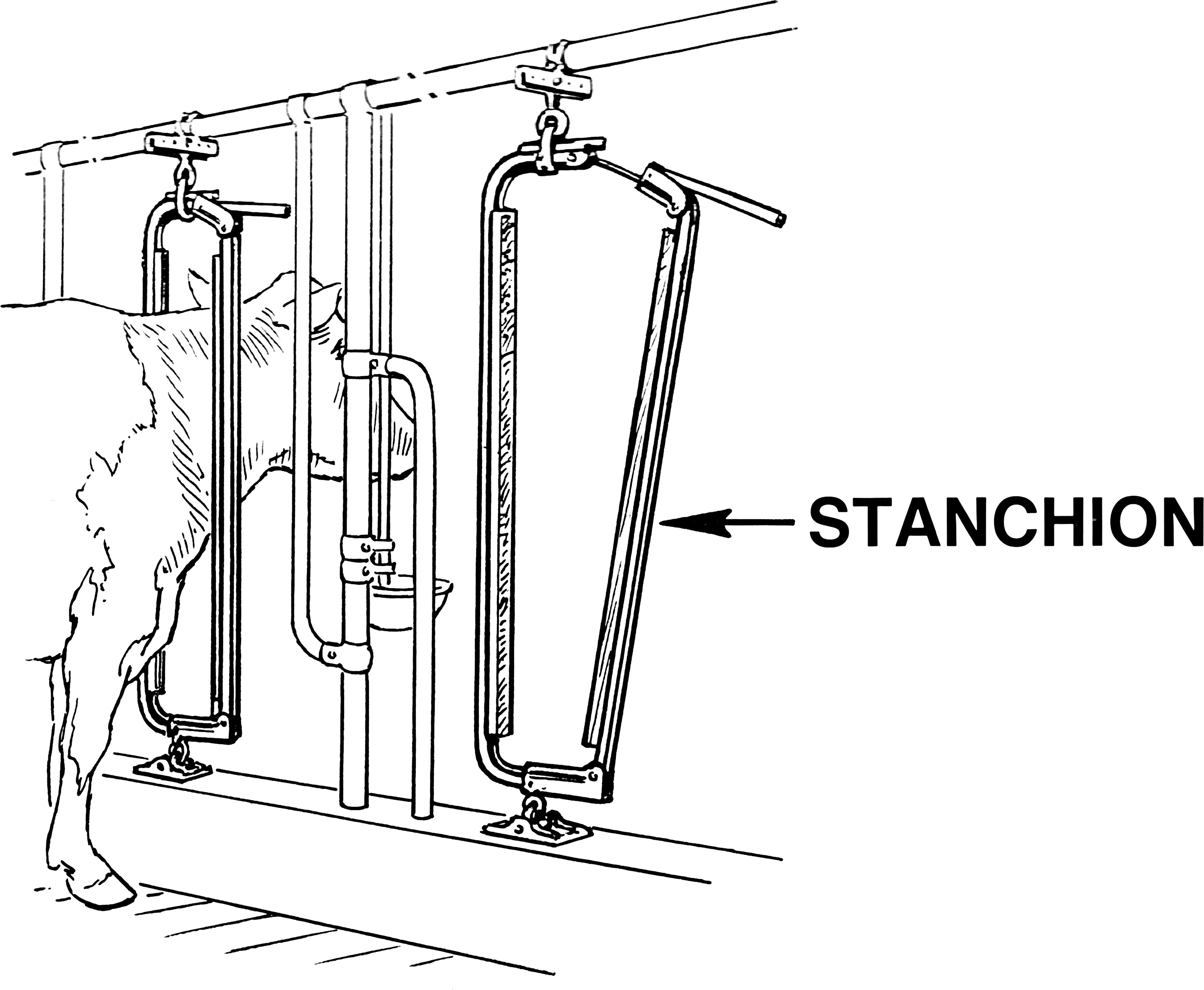
Livestock stanchion

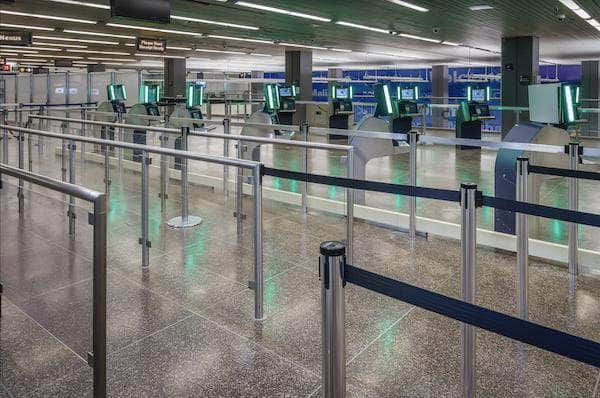
Retractable belt stanchions used to manage waiting queues at an airport

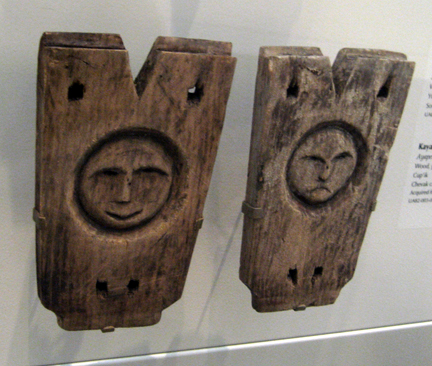
Cup'ik kayak stanchions, collection of the University of Alaska Museum of the North

== Stanchions to locate fire hydrants under deep snow ==
A heavy snowfall or a blizzard buries the fire hydrants, making it very hard to find them unless their location is adequately indicated.

=== Gallery ===
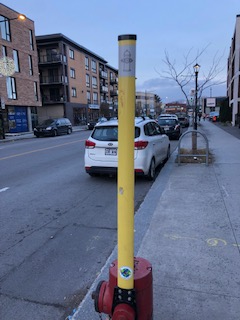
Fire hydrant locator on Gouin Boulevard in Cartierville.

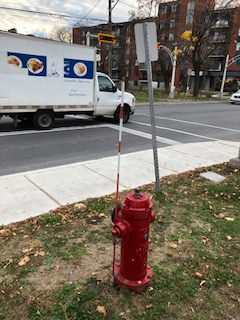
Fire hydrant locator in Laval

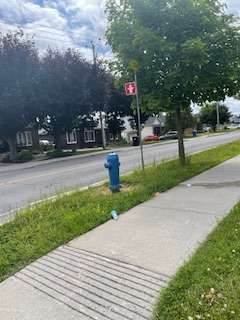
Fire hydrant locator stanchion in Salaberry-de-Valleyfield

== Transportation ==
- Removable and swiveling or fixed metal or wooden stanchions in sockets at the edges of the flatbed of flatcars, flat wagons, or the ends of the bolsters of a bogie bolster wagon.
- Removable and swiveling metal or wooden stanchions in sockets at the edges of the flatbed of flatbed semi-trailers, flatbed trucks, or logging trucks. In all cases, the lower end is shaped so as to hold it in place.
- In British and Australian English, the term is applied to the support structures for railway overhead power.

=== Gallery ===
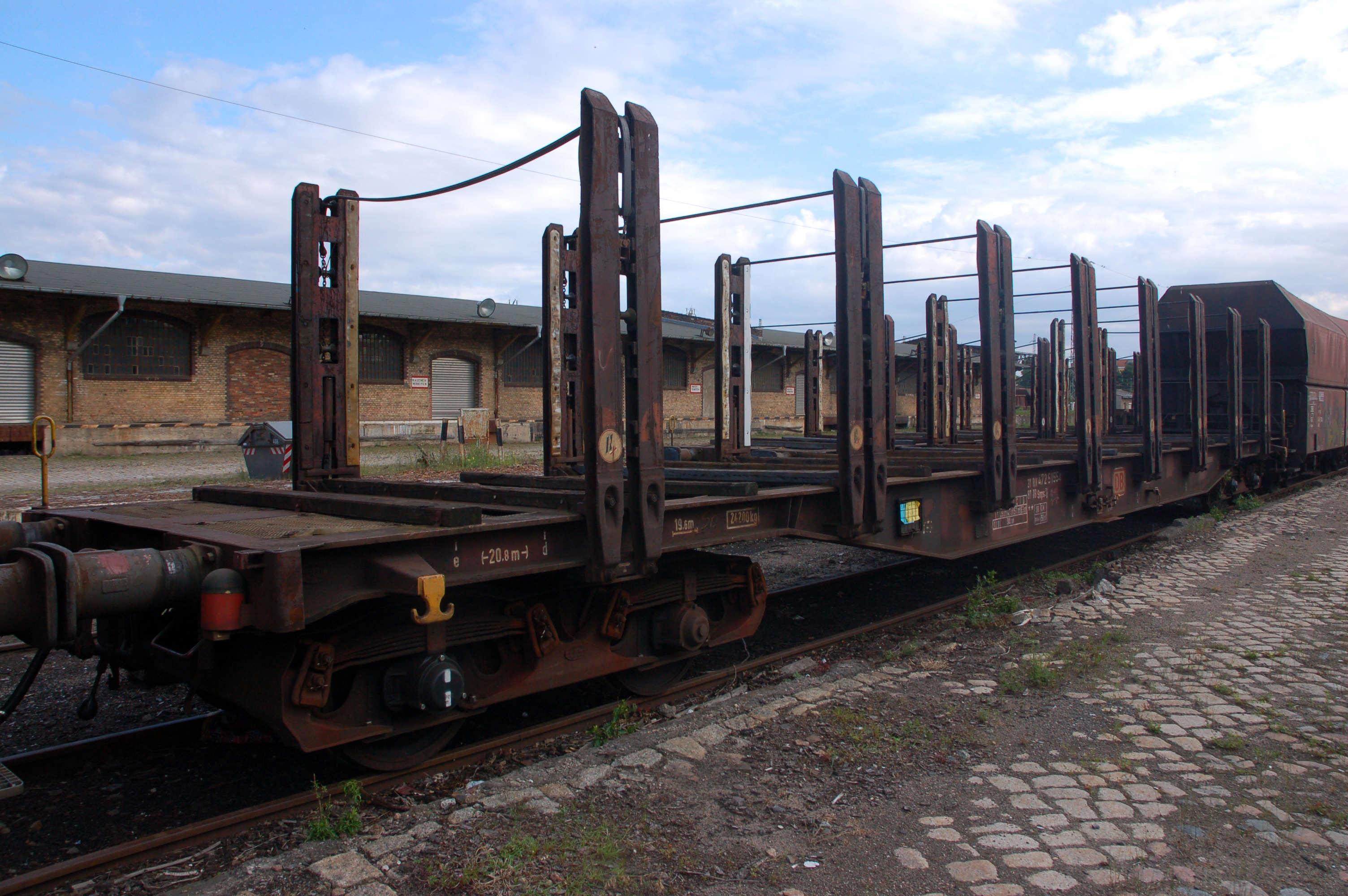
Special wagon with strong double stanchions for timber haulage (Snps^{719} owned by DB)

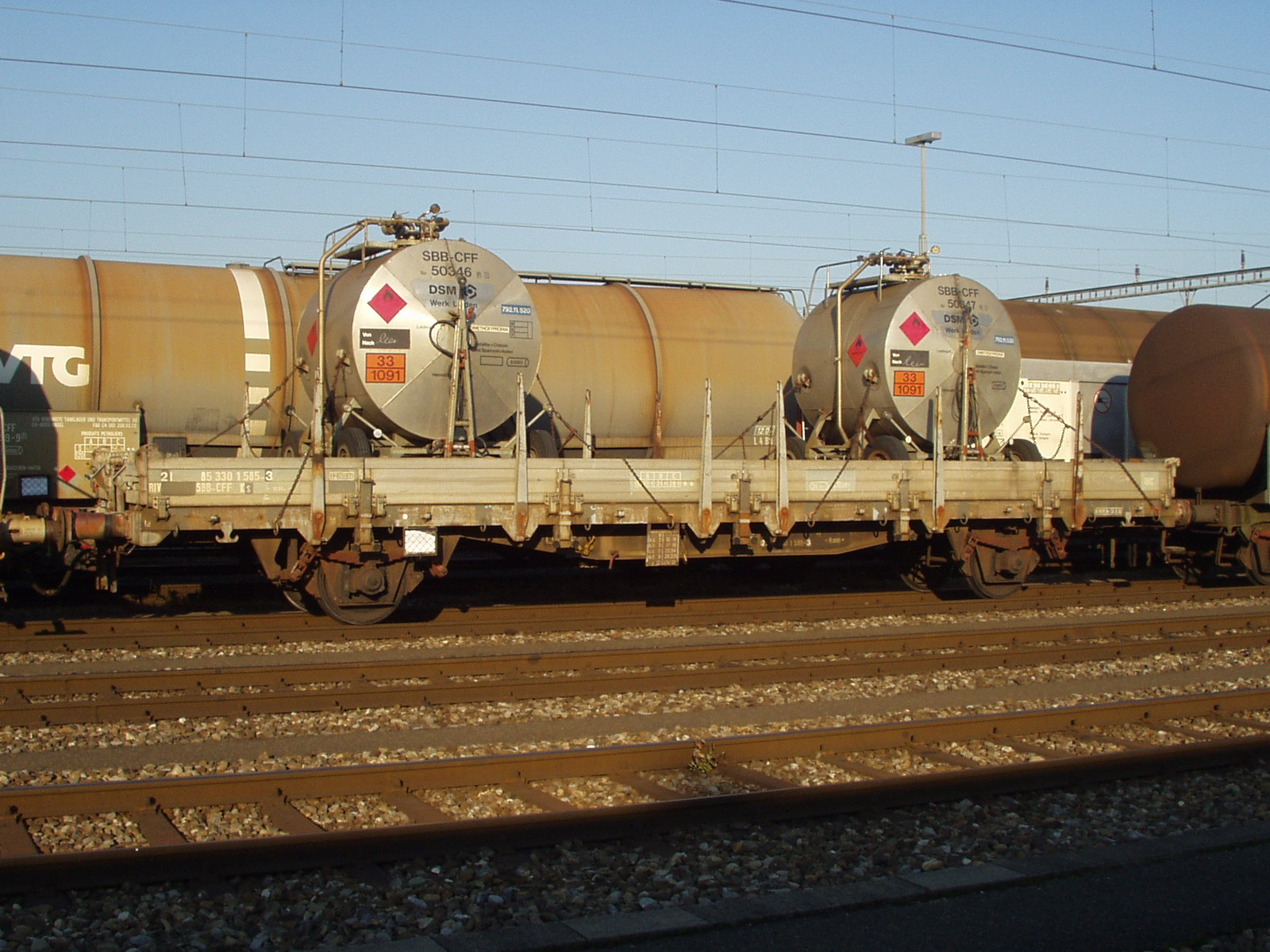
Flat wagons of Class Ks with standard dimensions and swivelling stanchions, loaded with Swiss containers

== See also ==
- Baluster
- Bollard
- Buttress
- Column
- Fencepost
- Guard rail
- Handrail
- Lampost
- Portable partition
- Post (structural)
- Scratch post
- Stanchion (nautical)
- Steel fence post
  - Agricultural fencing
- Tie down strap
- Wall stud
