= C.D. Bevington House and Stone Barn =

Historic house in Iowa, United States

- U.S. National Register of Historic Places
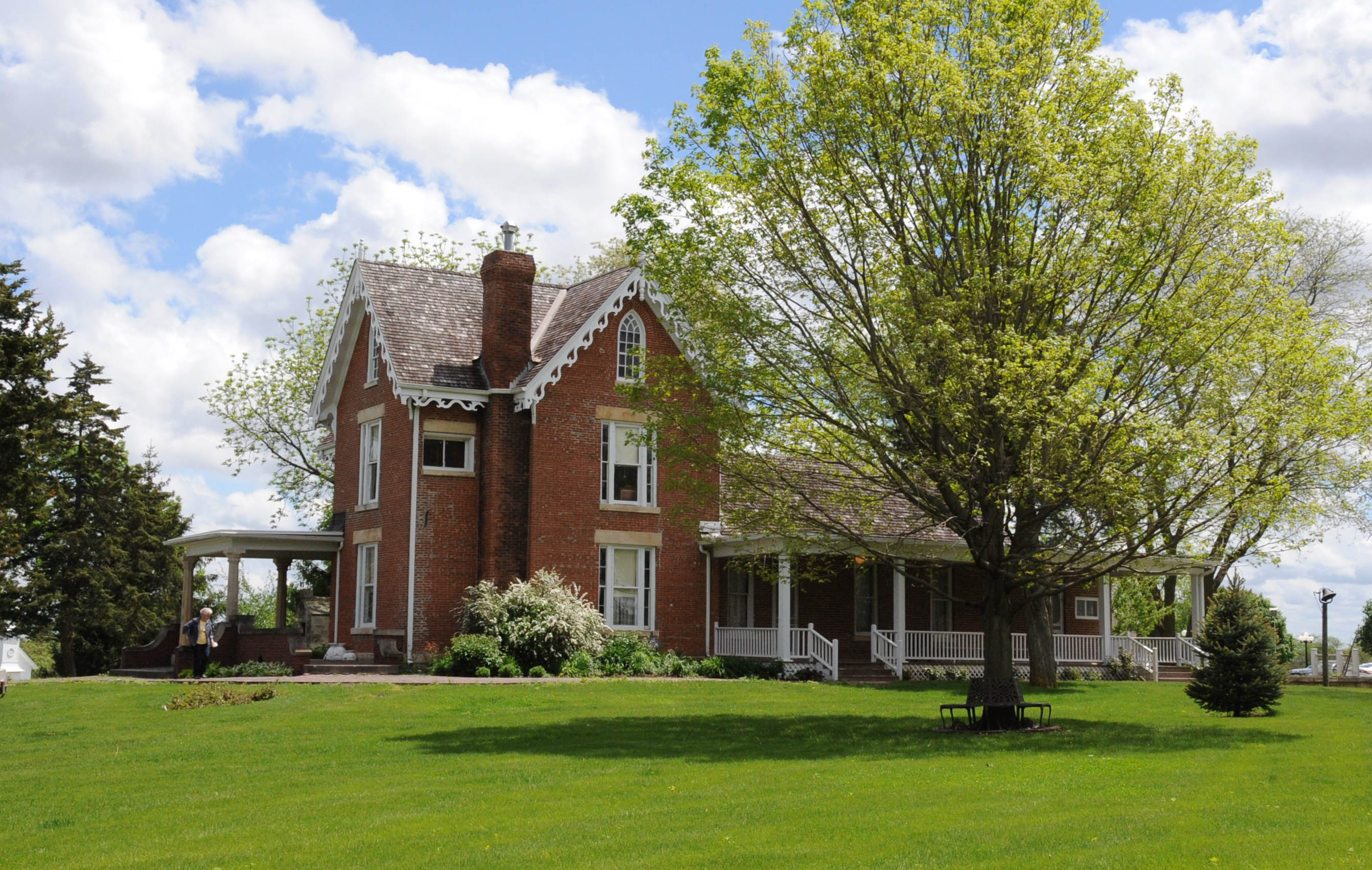
- C.D. Bevington House

- Location within Iowa Location within the United States
- Interactive map showing the location of C.D. Bevington House and Stone Barn
- Location: 805 S. 2nd Ave. Winterset, Iowa
- Coordinates: 41°19′40″N 94°00′54″W
- Area: less than one acre
- Built: 1856
- NRHP reference No.: 76000785
- Added to NRHP: December 12, 1976

The C.D. Bevington House and Stone Barn are historic buildings located in Winterset, Iowa, United States. Bevington was a pharmacist who passed through the area in 1849 on his way to the California Gold Rush. He settled in Winterset in 1853 after he made his fortune, and worked as a real estate agent and farmer. The house was built in the vernacular Gothic in 1856. The 2½-story brick structure features Gothic windows in the gable ends and carved bargeboards. The two porches were added around the turn of the 20th century. The two-story barn is composed of coursed rubble limestone. The lower level housed two horse stalls and stanchions for other livestock. A hay loft was on the upper level. The house and barn were listed on the National Register of Historic Places in 1976. Both buildings were donated to the Madison County Historical Society and are part of their museum complex.

== See also ==
- C.D. and Eliza Heath Bevington Privy
