= Wallrow =

A wallrow is a combination of a field boundary, dry stone wall and the spontaneous regeneration of scrubland brought about by the shelter of that wall, often containing species of trees, woody shrubs, herbaceous growth and other flora, and coined by Dr. Marcus Collier, a landscape ecologist and field boundary specialist from Ireland paper.

== Overview ==
Like fencerows, wallrows are distinct from hedgerows because they are not deliberately planted, nor are they as managed as hedgerows paper. The presence of a stone wall often obstructs mechanical management, thus facilitating scrub development. Woody vegetation is necessary for a field boundary to be a wallrow; a stone wall overgrown solely with herbaceous plants is not so much a wallrow as a wall. However, early stages of wallrow development generally consist of herbaceous inundation prior to the arrival of woody shrubs, with animals (especially birds) and the wind as the main dispersal agents. Woody vegetation is necessary to attract seed-dispersing faunae, and for soil development, thus facilitating further the spread of woody shrubs and trees. In this way, wallrows are strikingly similar to North American fencerows, though the obvious difference remains that fencerows are located along a wooden fence or under telegraph lines, and wallrows along a field boundary stone wall. Wallrows are common in Ireland, especially where fields are abandoned or under-managed.

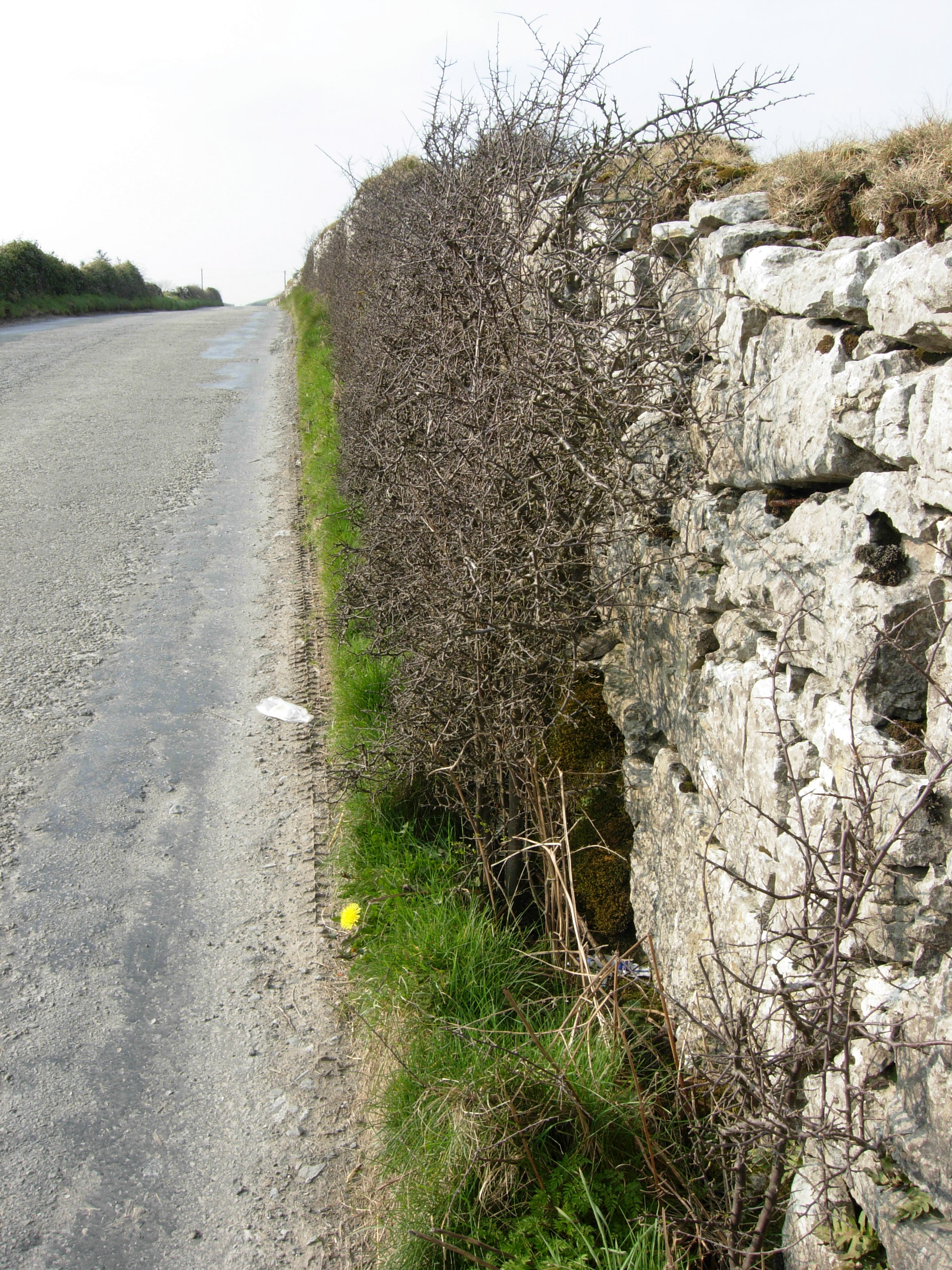
This is an example of a Wallrow, taken in Co. Wicklow, Ireland

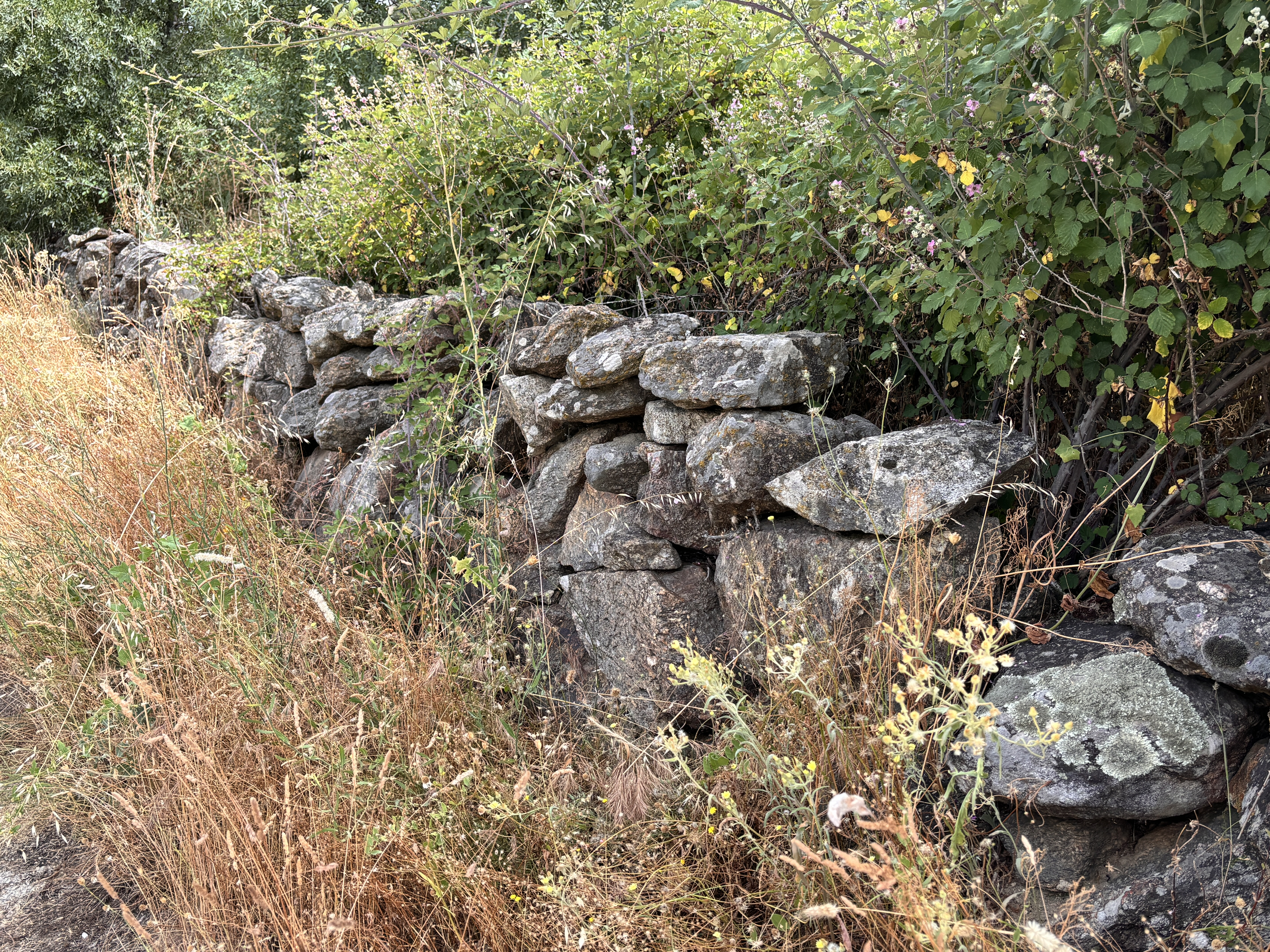
This is an example of a Wallrow, taken in the mountains north of Madrid Spain
