= Post pounder =

Tool

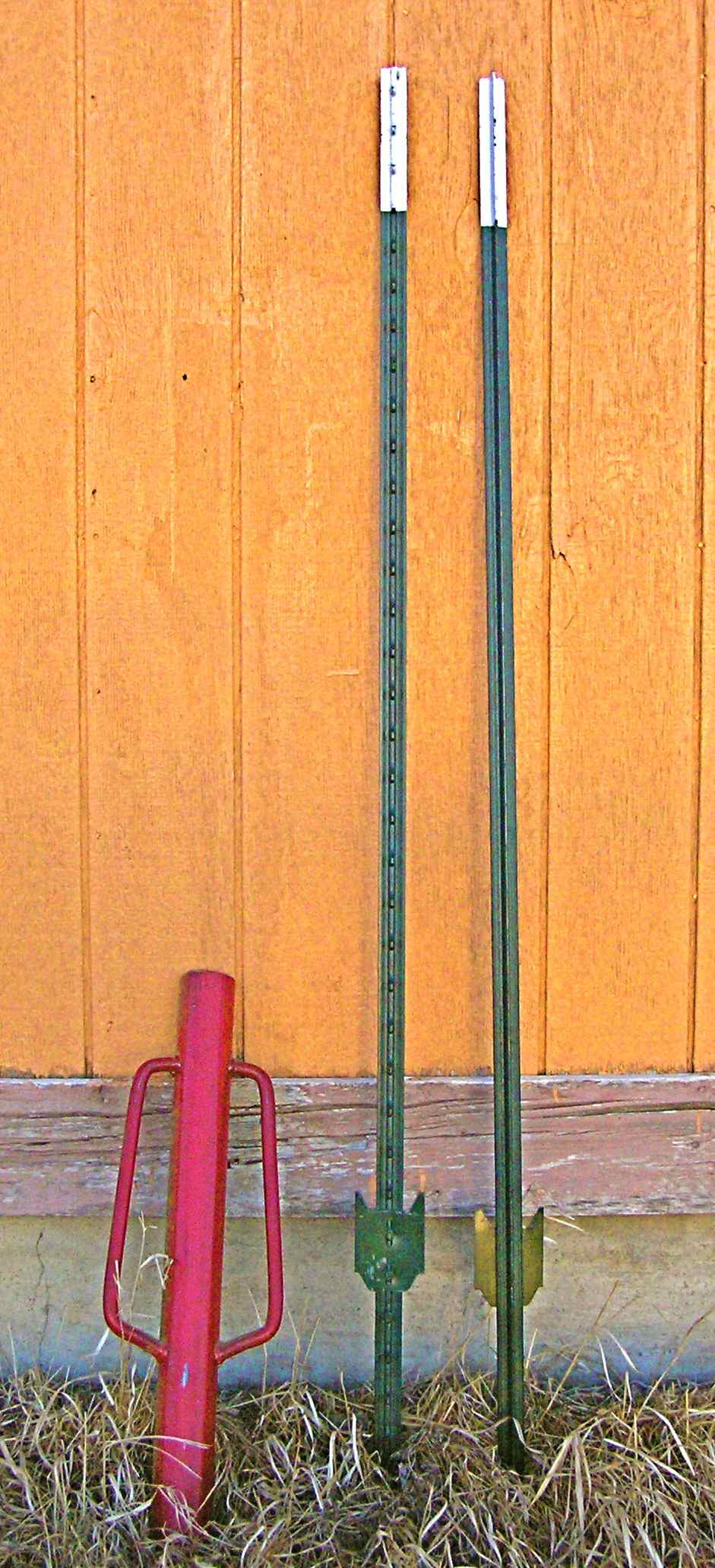
A red-colored post pounder next to two green steel t-posts

A post pounder, post driver, post rammer, post knocker or fence driver is a tool used for driving fence posts and similar items into land surfaces. It consists of a heavy steel pipe which is closed at one end and has handles welded onto the sides. It is normally used by one person, but larger versions may require two.

== History ==
An early type was developed in 1933 by the Pennsylvania Department of Transportation to aid the installation of fencing along roads and highways.

== Operation ==
The open end is put over the top of the post to be driven, then the tool is lifted and dropped repeatedly onto the top of the post. The closed end strikes the top of the post, driving it into the ground. Unlike a maul it can be used easily on tall posts, such as those used for deer fencing. Because the tube guides the striking force consistently in line with the post and strikes it across its full width, a post pounder usually damages the top of the post less than a maul. It is not suitable for posts which will be shorter than the length of the tool, or for posts which do not fit easily into the tube because of bulges or curves, or their over-large diameter. The tool is difficult to use on slanting posts.

The post pounder can also be used to remove t-posts. To do so, put the closed end of the post pounder on the ground about 6 inches from the t-post. It should be on the side of the post with the knobs. Push back on the t-post away from the pounder, then push the top of the pounder so the rim sets beneath the lowest knob possible on the t-post. With the pounder lodged beneath the t-post knob, pull the t-post back to the starting position and it will lift up a few inches. Repeat process until t-post can be removed.

== Safety and Precautions ==
Single-person post pounders tend to be around 20 pounds (9 kg), but weight varies with model types. The diameter depends on the size of the post to be pounded. They can be dangerous to handle, especially if the lower edge of the pounder catches on the top of the post, when it can pivot towards the user and strike them on the head.

Hearing protection and a hard hat are often recommended.

== See also ==
- Steel fence post
