= C.D. and Eliza Heath Bevington Privy =

- U.S. National Register of Historic Places
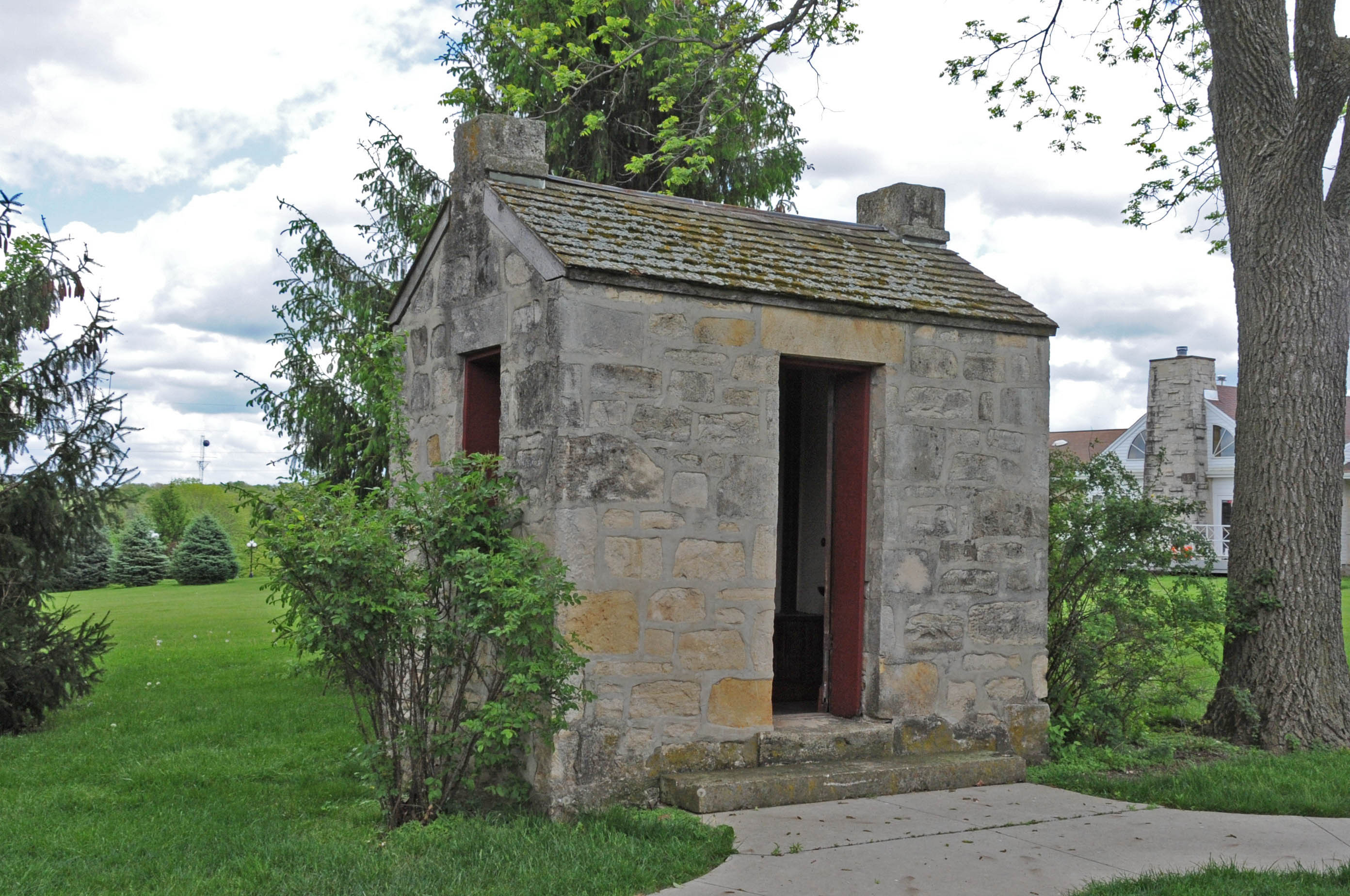

- Location within Iowa Location within the United States
- Location: 805 S. 2nd Ave. Winterset, Iowa
- Coordinates: 41°19′40″N 94°00′53″W
- Area: less than one acre
- Built: 1856
- MPS: Legacy in Stone: The Settlement Era of Madison County, Iowa TR
- NRHP reference No.: 87001669
- Added to NRHP: September 29, 1987

The C.D. and Eliza Heath Bevington Privy is a historic building located in Winterset, Iowa, United States. Bevington was a pharmacist who passed through the area in 1849 on his way to the California Gold Rush. He settled in Winterset in 1853 after he made his fortune, and worked as a real estate agent, farmer, livestock dealer, and banker. The 7.5-by-10.33-foot (2.29 by 3.15 m) structure is composed of roughly squared quarry faced rubble that is laid in a two against one bond. There is a stone vault with a depth of 6 feet (1.8 m) beneath the entire structure. The privy served the C.D. Bevington House. It was listed on the National Register of Historic Places in 1987. It is now part of a museum complex operated by the Madison County Historical Society.
