= Stanchion (nautical) =

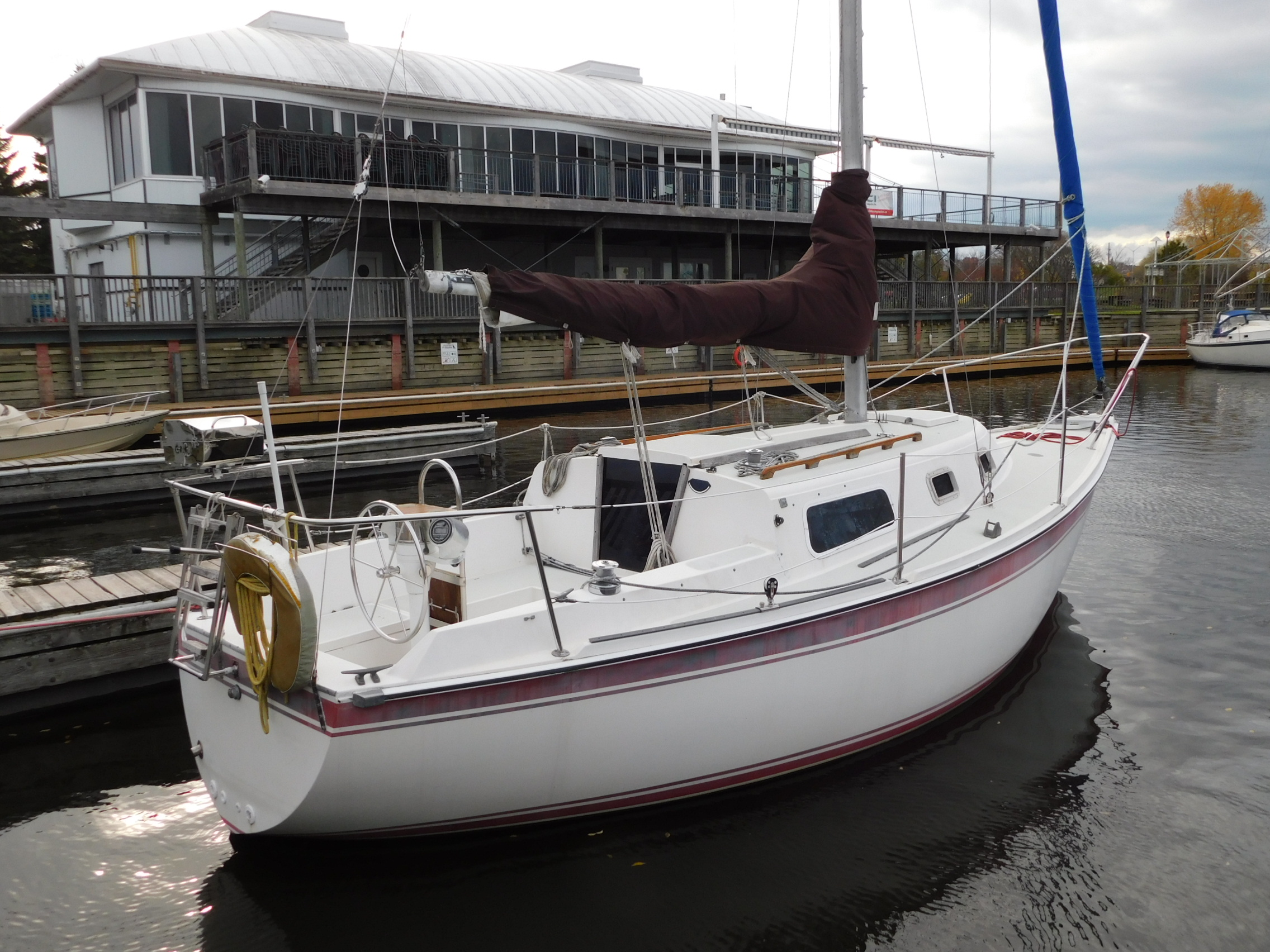
Stanchions mounted to the gunwale (rim) of a sailboat

In a nautical context, a stanchion is a vertical post used to fence a boat's walking surface, such as a deck or top. Cables called lifelines are strung between the stanchions to keep people from falling.

== See also ==
- Stanchion
- Glossary of nautical terms (M–Z)
