= Fladry =

Anti-wolf fencing, with fluttering flags

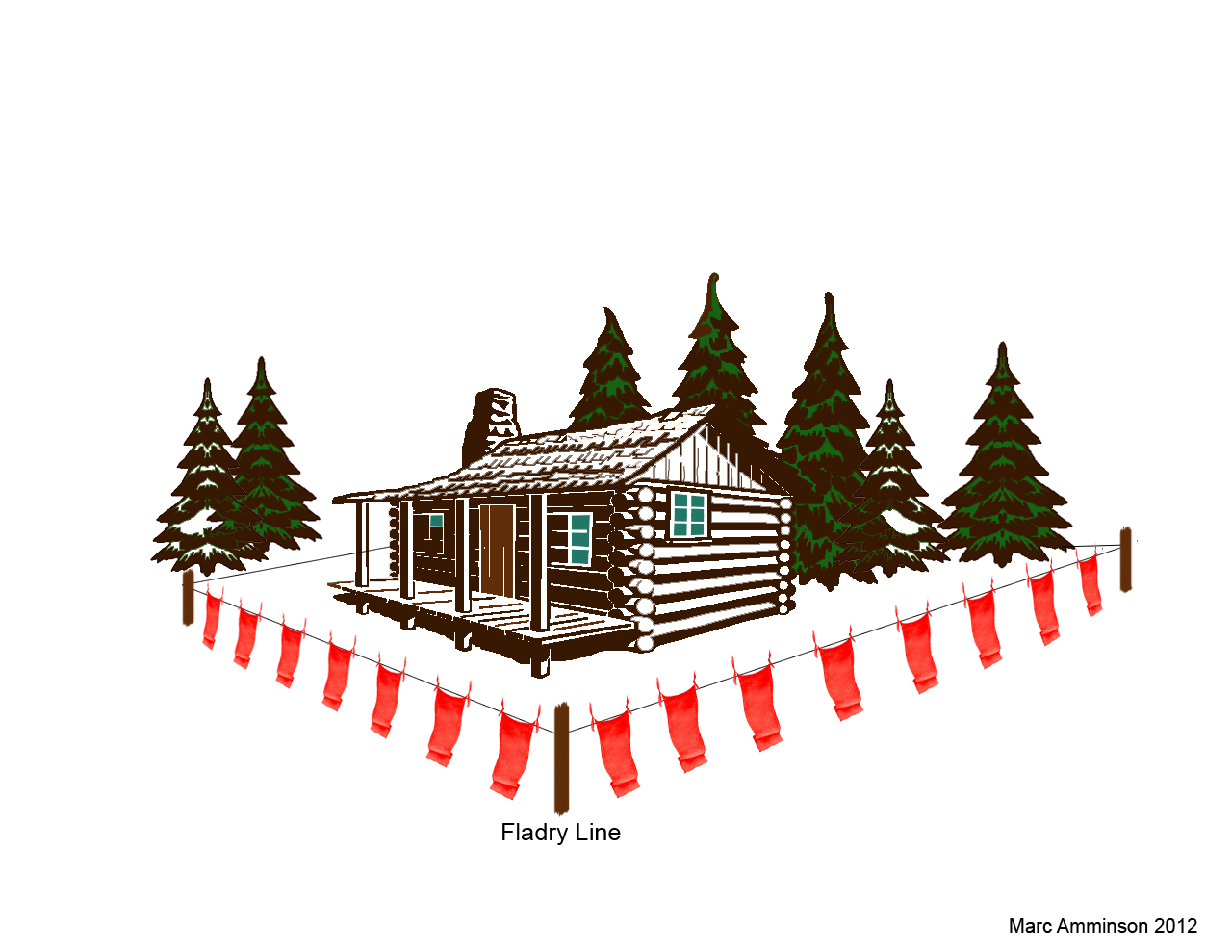
Illustration of Fladry use

Fladry is a rope mounted along the top of a fence, from which are suspended strips of fabric or colored flags, that will flap in a breeze. They are intended to deter wolves from crossing the line. Fladry lines have been used for this purpose for several centuries, traditionally for hunting wolves in Eastern Europe. They may be used to protect livestock in small pastures from wolves and coyotes. They are effective temporarily, as the novelty may soon wear off once the line has been crossed, and particularly if the strips are coiled by the wind. The fladry lines can also be electrified, making so-called "turbo fladry".

Sometimes this technique is used to alert horses and cattle to the presence of a fence, as the use of smoothwire fences and one strand of electric may not be seen by an animal unfamiliar with such.

The use of fladry has also been suggested among techniques to prevent wolves from being attracted to dead stock that may be in conditions that make it difficult for ranchers to remove or bury the carcasses, which endangers the livestock herd once the wolves are attracted.

== In culture ==
The Soviet singer and songwriter Vladimir Vysotsky (1938-1980) mentions fladry in his famous song "Wolf Hunt"; 1968). Fladry is understood as a metaphor of the stance of powers-that-be toward the people of free spirit, and the singer sees "crossing the fladry" as a salvation (for volves, in the song, but his listeners knew what he meant). The "Wolf Hunt" was one of the most famous songs in the Soviet Union during the 1970s.
