= Steel fence post =

T-shaped, studded post used for fencing

A steel fence post, also called (depending on design or country) a T-post, a Y-post, or variants on star post, is a type of fence post or picket. They are made of steel and are sometimes manufactured using durable rail steel.

== Applications ==
Steel fence posts are typically used to support various types of safe t-post brackets, barbed or smooth wire, or wire mesh. The end view of the post creates an obvious T, Y, or other shape.

The posts are driven into the ground with a manual or pneumatic post pounder.

All along the spine of the post are studs or nubs that prevent the steel brackets, barbed wire, smooth wire, or mesh from sliding up or down the post. They are generally designated as 1.01, 1.25 or 1.33, and 1.5 (for high-fence ranches), referring to the weight in pounds per lineal foot. In the US, the most common weights are 1.25 and 1.33. Metric countries use similar hardware, but the designations are given as 1.86 and 2.04, respectively, for kilograms per lineal meter.

Posts are commonly painted with a white tip on top, since white improves the visibility of the fence line. When driving the post with a post pounder the white top paint is also a visual means to ensure that the user does not raise the pounder too high while pounding. Raising the pounder too high allows it to lean towards the user and could lean to striking them in the head.

== International variations ==
While T-Posts are more common in the United States, Y-posts are more common in Australia and New Zealand where they are sometimes called either star pickets or "Waratahs", after the company which registered a patent for them in 1926.

In New Zealand, Waratahs are often used for trail blazing.

In areas where treated timber is relatively inexpensive, such as the British Isles, wooden fence-posts are used and steel ones are unusual for agricultural purposes. In the British Isles, steel posts are, however, often used for fencing into solid rock. In this case a hole is drilled into the rock, and the post is fixed using cement or epoxy.

In Australia these are normally called a star picket, and sizing is by length, normally one notch on the top and holes down the length. They are often covered in a black bituminous coating.

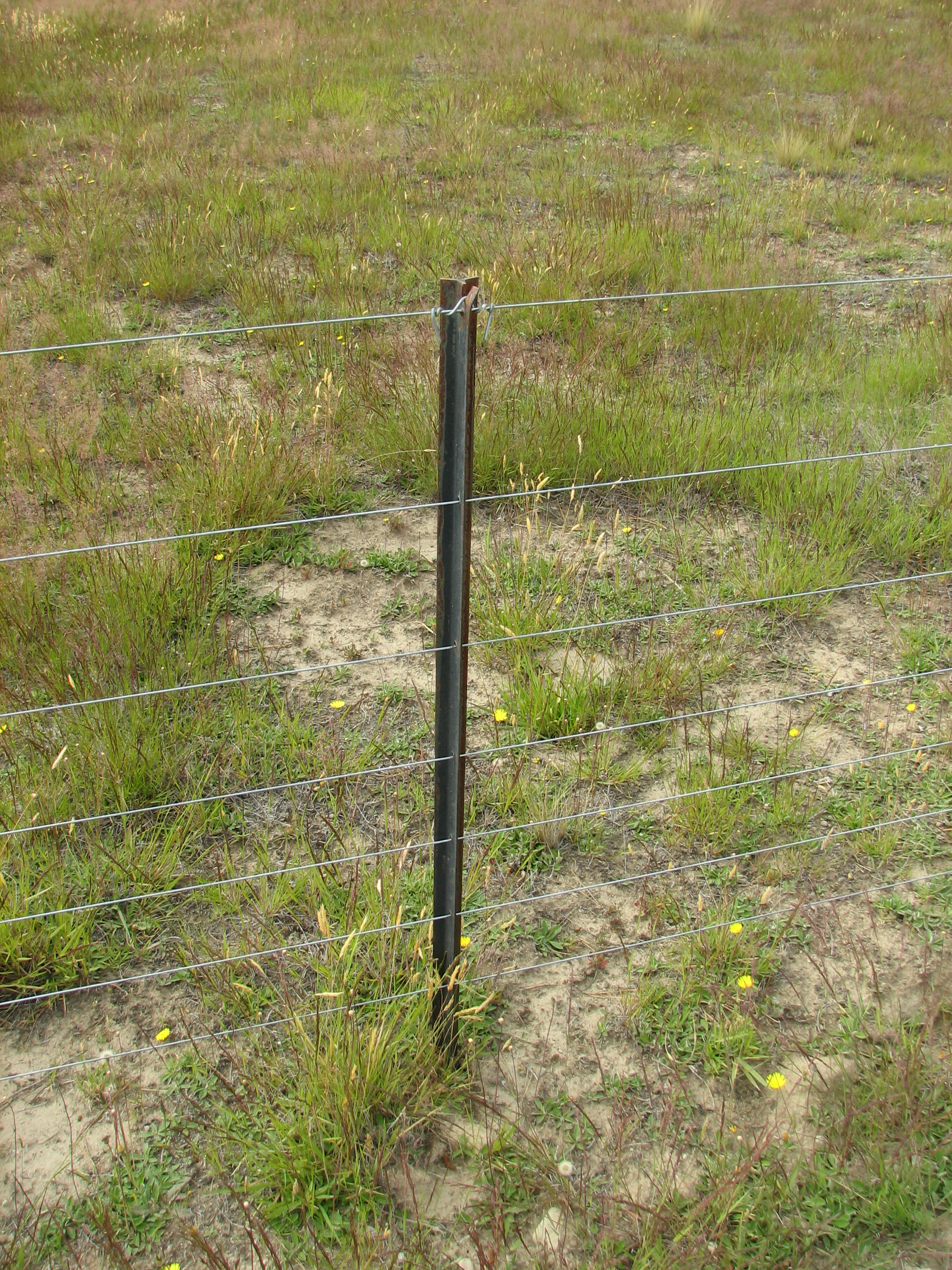
A steel post on a standard seven wire fence in New Zealand.

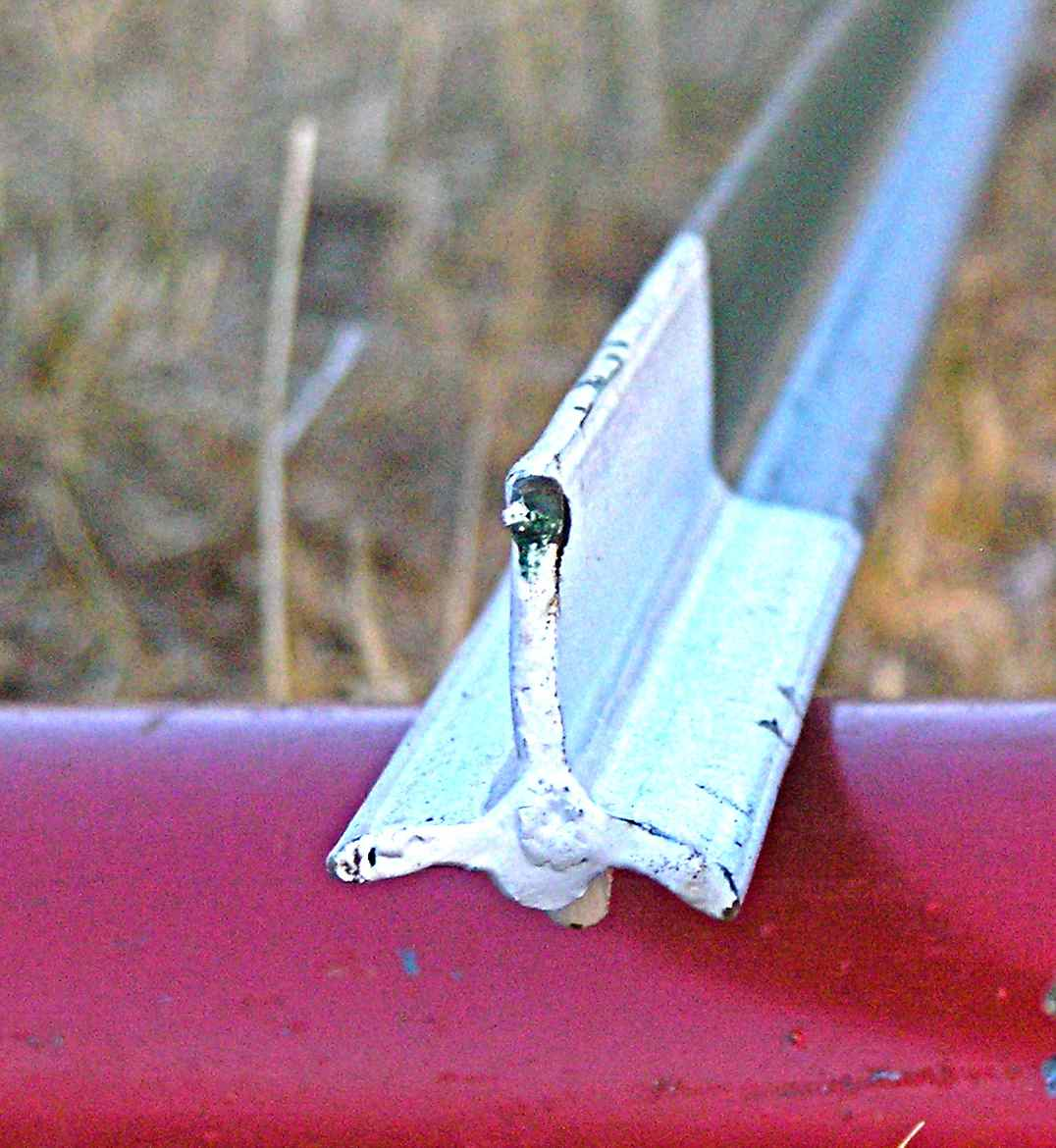
End-on view of a T-post, showing the T-shape that gives the post its name.

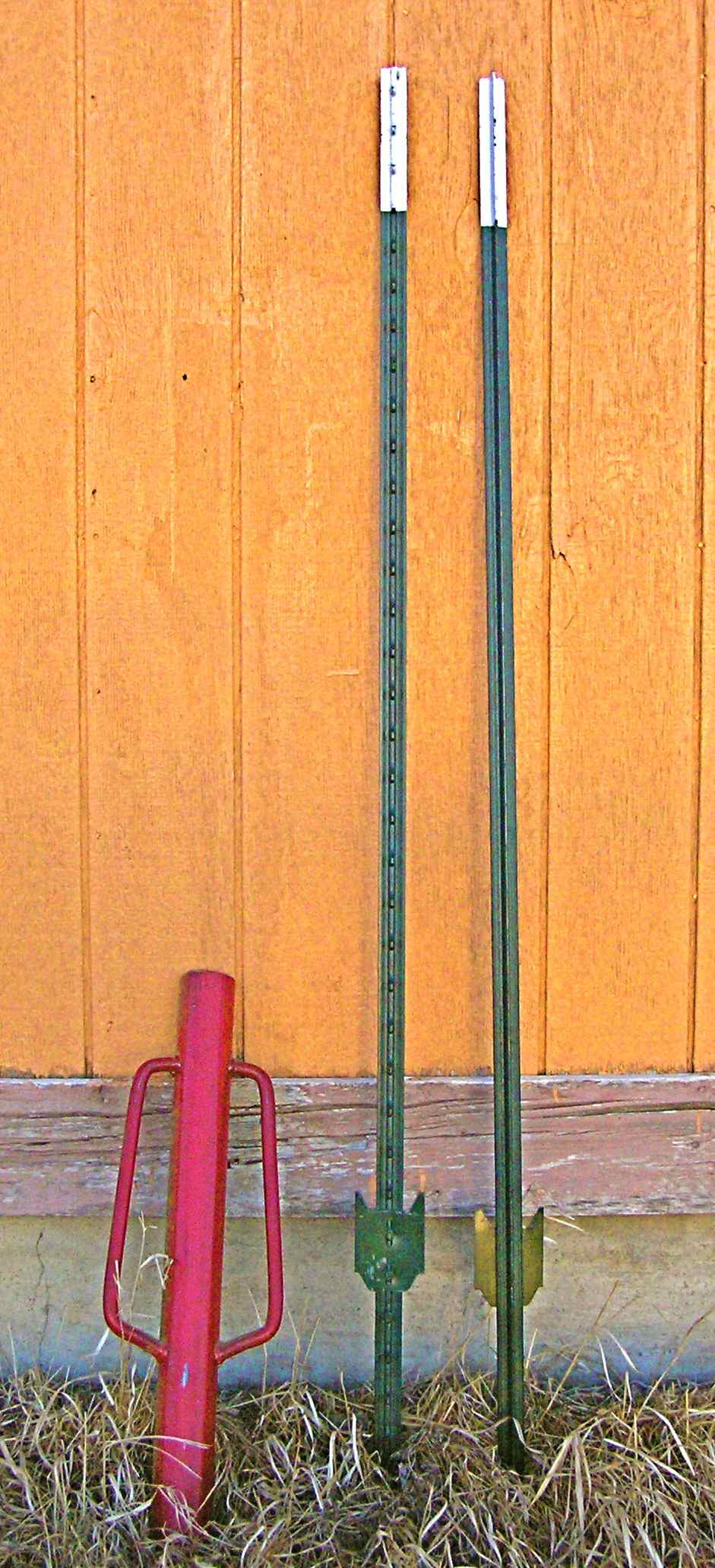
Two T-posts and red post pounder (or driver) used to drive them into the ground. The flat plate helps stabilize the post, which is driven into the ground until the plate is buried.

== See also ==
- Agricultural fencing
- Scratch post
- Stanchion
