= Agricultural fencing =

Used to keep animals in or out of an area

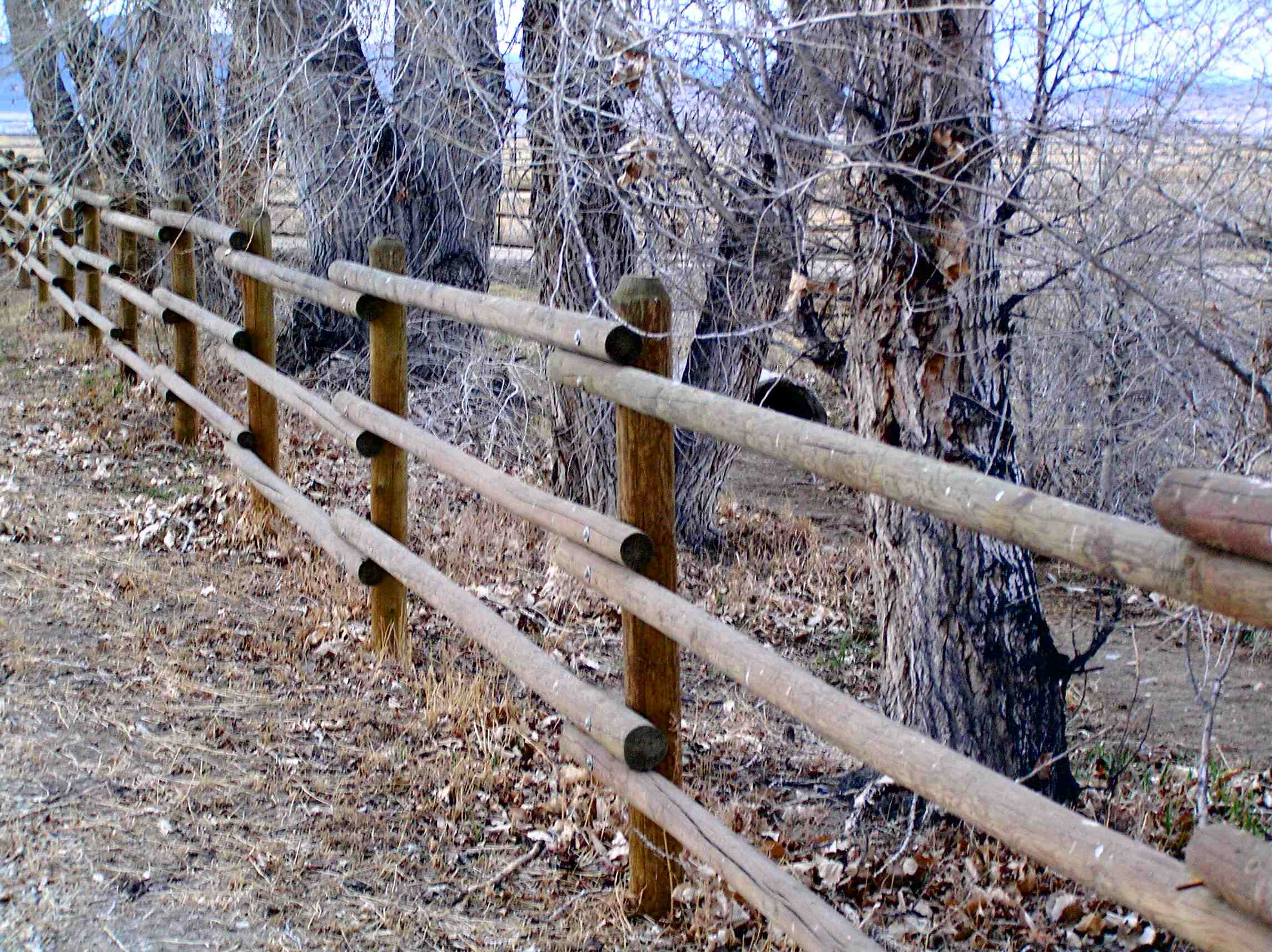
A sturdy and well-made wooden post and rail fence

In agriculture, fences are used to keep animals out of, or inside, an area. They can be made from a wide variety of materials, depending on terrain, location, and animals to be confined. Most agricultural fencing is about 4 feet (1.2 m) high, and in some places, the height and construction of fences designed to hold livestock is mandated by law.

A fencerow is the strip of land by a fence that is left uncultivated. It may be a hedgerow or a shelterbelt (windbreak) or a refuge for native plants. If not too narrow, it acts as a habitat corridor.

== History ==
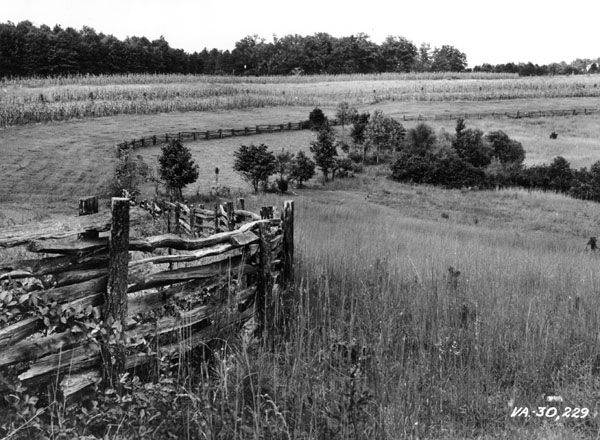
Timber agricultural fence (1938)

Historically, throughout most of the world, domesticated livestock would roam freely and were fenced out of areas such as gardens or crop fields where they were unwanted. Over time, especially where crop agriculture became dominant, and the population density of both humans and animals was significant, livestock owners were required to fence their animals in.

The earliest fences were made of available materials, usually stone or wood, and these materials are still used for some fences today. In areas where field stones are plentiful, fences have been built over the years as stones are removed from fields during tillage and crop planting. The stones were placed along the field edge, and over time the piles grew into walls.

In other areas, fences were constructed of timber. Log fences or split-rail fences were simple fences constructed in newly cleared areas by stacking log rails. Earth could also be used as a fence; an example was what is now called the sunken fence, or "ha-ha," a type of wall built by digging a ditch with one steep side (which animals cannot scale) and one sloped side (where the animals roam).

== Fence laws ==
The tradition of fencing out unwanted livestock prevails even today in some sparsely populated areas. For example, until the mid-20th century, most states in the American West were called "open range" ("fence out") states, in contrast to Eastern and Midwestern states, which long had "fence in" laws requiring owners to confine livestock. Though the open range was part of the western tradition, it was progressively limited. The first restriction was an obligation to keep cattle from roaming onto state and federal highways, where collisions with vehicles posed a public safety hazard. In addition, voters could voluntarily designate certain heavily farmed areas as "herd district," where livestock needed to be fenced in. This process also became popular in areas where the development of hobby farms created conflicts between large and small landowners. Over time, court cases steadily limited the application of open-range law to the point that, in many parts of the American West, it is the exception rather than the rule today.

In the United Kingdom, the law differs between private land and common land. On private land, it is the owner's responsibility to fence livestock in, but landowners bordering a common are responsible for fencing the common's livestock out.

Additionally, railways in the UK are fenced to keep livestock and people out, as required, unlike in many other countries. Either Network Rail or the landowner is responsible for maintaining the fences.

== Fence styles ==
=== Wire fences ===
The principle of wire fences is that they are supported mainly by tension, being stretched between heavy strutted or guy-wired posts at ends, corners, and ideally at intervals in longer stretches (every 50 to 300 meters, 150 to 1000 feet). Between these braced posts are additional smaller wooden or metal posts which keep the wires spaced and upright, usually 3 to 6 meters (10 to 20 feet) apart, depending on the style of fencing used.

Traditionally, wire fencing material is made of galvanized mild steel, but galvanized high-tensile steel is now also used in many places. To prevent sagging of the fence, which raises the risk of entanglement or escape, the wire is tensioned as much as the material will safely allow during construction by various means, including a hand-operated "wire stretcher" or "fence stretcher" (called a "monkey strainer" in some areas) or other leverage devices, a winch, or even by carefully pulling with a tractor or other vehicle.

Wire fences are typically run on wooden posts, either from trees commercially grown in plantations or (particularly in the American West) cut from public lands. When less expensive or more readily available than wood, steel T-posts or star posts are used, usually alternating every 2 to 5 steel posts with a more stable wood post. Non-electrified wire is attached to wooden posts using fencing staples (at intermediate posts, staples are fitted loosely so the wire can slide). Non-electrified wire is held on T-posts by wire "clips" made of smooth galvanized wire that wrap around the back of the post and hook onto the wire on either side.

Other than in a truly desert climate, use of rot-resistant wooden posts or steel posts is advised. In the United States, wood with natural rot resistance, such as oak and juniper, was often used until it became scarce in the 1950s. Then, chemically treated pine and spruce posts became prevalent, and they are also widely used in the United Kingdom, together with chestnut. Creosote, pentachlorophenol, and chromated copper arsenate are all widely used in the US and elsewhere for treatment (although some of these chemicals are subject to legal controls).

==== Barbed wire ====
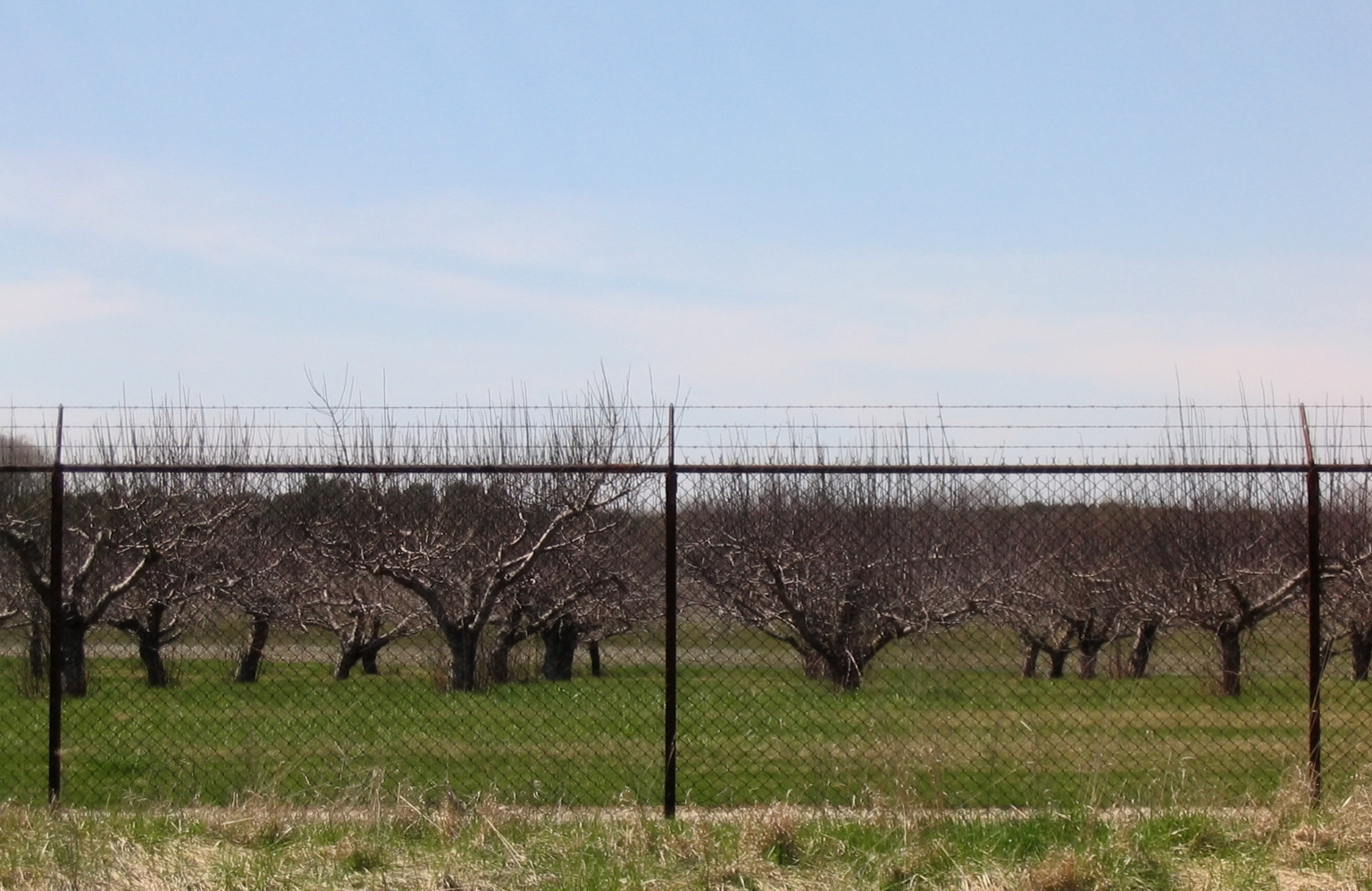
Chain link fence with barbed wire on top.

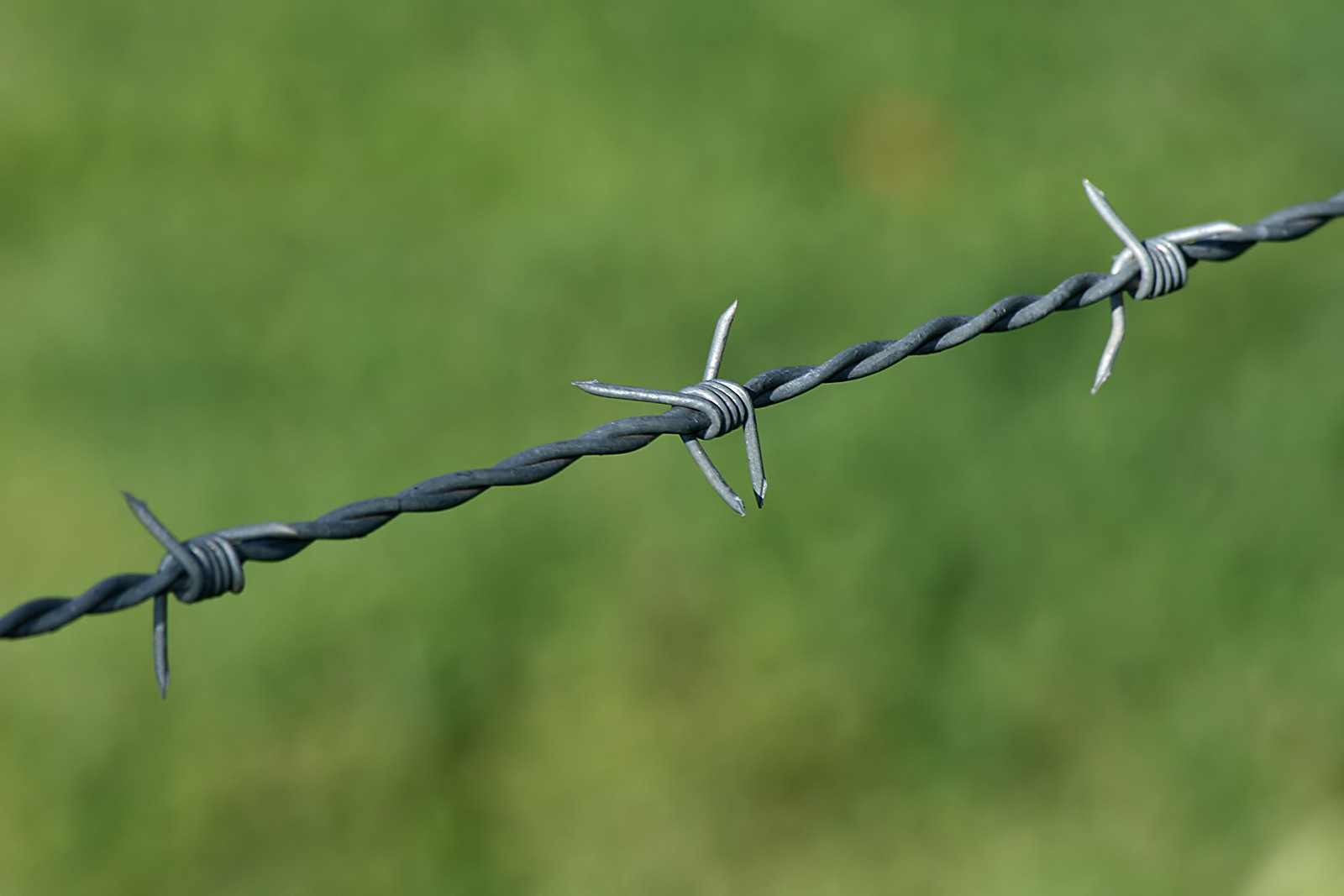
Detail of barbed wire

The Industrial Revolution brought the first barbed wire (also "barbwire" or just "barb") fences, which were widely used after their introduction in the mid-19th century. This technology made it economically feasible to fence rangeland for the first time. In the United States, the introduction of barbed wire contributed to the range wars of that century, as various ranch interests attempted to use barbed wire fences to claim exclusive access to the best pasture and water resources, including those lands in the public domain. It also exacerbated tensions between cattle ranchers and crop farmers, particularly when access to water was at issue.

Many manufacturers have made barbed wire in an almost endless variety of styles. For the most part, these were functionally identical. The differences reflected peculiarities of each manufacturing process rather than the deliberate design of the end product. Some enthusiasts collect sections of unusual barbed wire.

The traditional barbed wire used since the late 19th century and into the present day was made from two mild steel wires twisted together, usually of about 12 or 14 gauge, with about 15–30 twists per meter. Steel barbs were attached every 10–20 cm (3.9–7.9 in). Barbs had either two or four points, with the two-point design featuring somewhat heavier, longer barbs. The relative merits of two-point vs. four-point barbed wire are the subject of deeply held views among many farmers and ranchers, to the extent that both types are still made today.

Typically, four strands of barbed wire, with the lowest strand no more than 12 inches (300 mm) from the ground and the top strand at least 48 inches above the ground, make up a legal fence in the western United States. Better-quality fences have five strands, older fences often had only three strands, and just two strands are widely used in Britain if only adult cattle are being contained. Other variations exist, depending on local laws and the purpose of the fence.

Barbed wire is particularly effective for containing cattle. In pastures containing both cattle and sheep, one or two strands of barbed wire are used in conjunction with woven wire to both discourage cattle from reaching over the top of a fence and to keep sheep from crawling under. Though often used in many areas for horses, barbed wire is not advised; its use is considered poor management. There is a very high risk of injury occurring when a thin-skinned, fast-moving animal with long legs runs into it or puts a leg through the strands.

==== Smooth wire ====
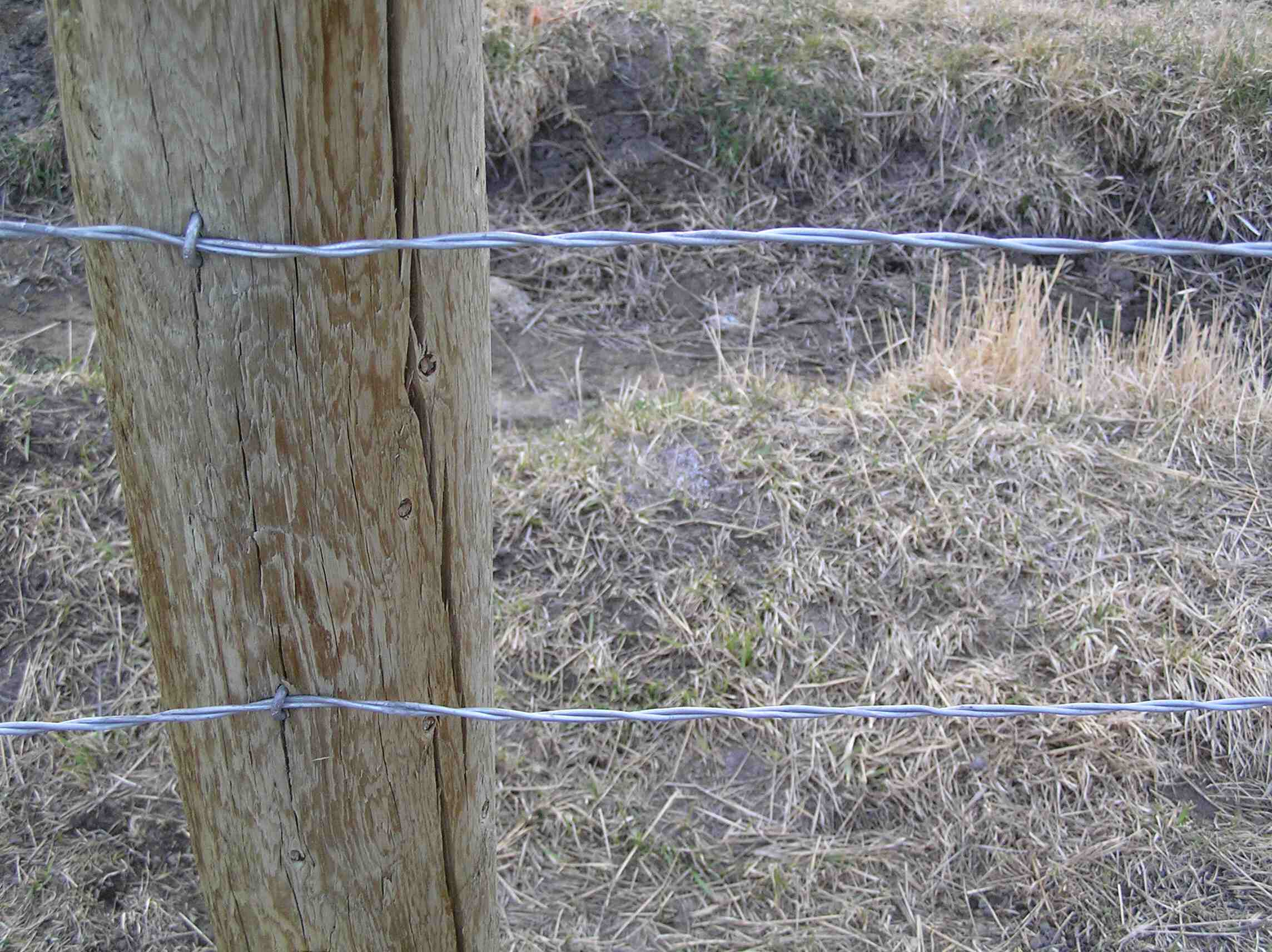
Smooth (or plain) wire is less likely to cause lacerations than barbed wire

Smooth (or plain) wire is essentially the same product as barbed wire with no barbs – either a two-wire twist or a single strand. Its primary advantage is that it is less likely to cause lacerations and cuts if an animal becomes entangled in it or rubs against it. However, animals will readily lean on mild steel smooth wire, stretching it out of shape or loosening it from the posts, and for this reason, it is often used in high-tensile form, which more easily springs back to its original length. Smooth wire fencing is often used as an inexpensive means to safely contain horses and other animals at high risk of entanglement, usually in conjunction with a line of electric fence. Smooth wire is also used to secure fence-post braces and for other uses where barbed wire is not recommended.

==== High tensile wire ====
High tensile (H-T or HT) fencing is a special hard, springy steel wire that was introduced in the 1970s and has slowly gained acceptance. The wire may be a single strand of plain or barbed wire, or woven mesh, made from high-carbon steel wire capable of holding a higher tension than mild steel. It permits the use of wider post spacings and is neither stretched easily by animals, nor by fallen trees or branches. It can be insulated and electrified. Because of the wide spacing between posts, thin metal or wooden spacers (or "droppers") may be attached to the wires between posts to maintain that spacing.

Joining HT wire is difficult because of its stiffness and reduced strength when bent sharply. However, it may be joined effectively with proprietary clips. HT wire is more expensive than mild steel, but because fewer posts are needed, the overall cost of the fencing is usually comparable.

Because it does not stretch, HT wire is less likely to entangle animals. However, for the same reason, if an animal becomes entangled or runs into a few strands at high speed, it can be deadly, sometimes referred to as having a "cheese cutter" effect.

Trellising for horticultural purposes is generally constructed from HT wire because it can withstand higher crop loads without breaking or stretching.

==== Woven and mesh wire ====
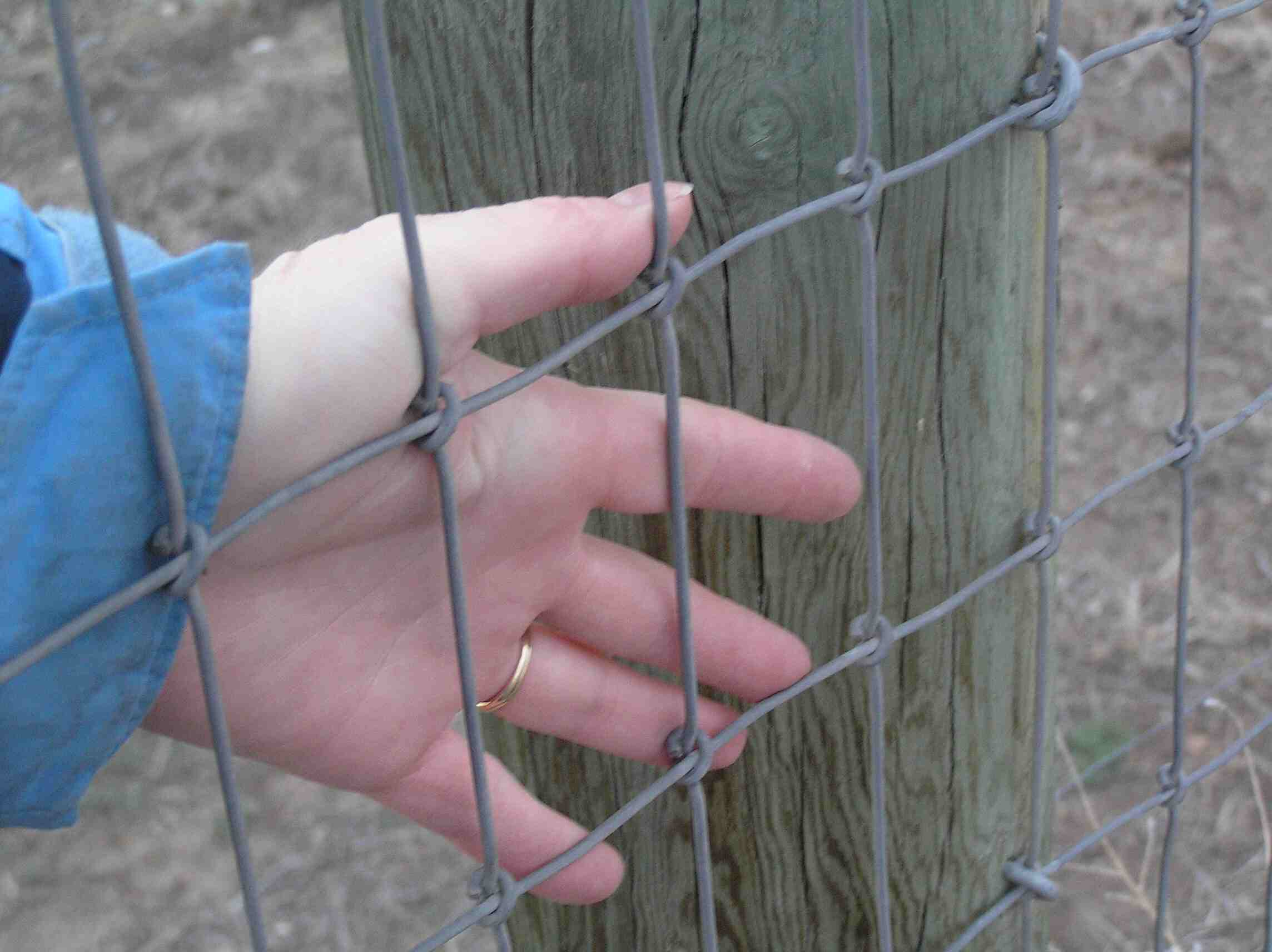
A closely spaced woven wire, such as this "no climb" fence, has a lower risk of animals becoming entrapped and injured. Note "knots" at each junction securing the wire together

Woven and mesh wire fencing material has smooth horizontal wires and vertical wires (called stays). Wire spacing and height of fence are dependent on which type of animal is being contained. Agricultural woven wire is identifiable by wire "knots" wrapped around each intersecting wire. Mesh wire material is spot-welded at each junction. Woven wire and mesh wire fences are also called square wire, box wire, page wire, sheep fence, or hog fence in the United States, sheep netting or pig netting in Britain, and ringlock in Australia.

Barbed wire fences cannot effectively contain smaller livestock such as pigs, goats, or sheep. Where these animals are to be fenced, woven wire is used instead, sometimes with one or more strands of barbed wire at the top, and sometimes at the bottom to prevent animals from pushing under. For swine, a ground-level barbed wire strand or electrified wire is used as well to prevent digging beneath the fence.

Woven wire with large openings has some potential hazards. Large hoofed animals can put a foot through wide gaps while grazing along the fence line or reaching over it, and then become tangled in the fence. A variation, called "field fence," has narrower openings at the bottom and wider openings at the top, which helps prevent animals from putting their feet through the fence. For example, horses in particular are safer when kept inside a woven-wire fence with smaller openings, such as a "no climb" fence with openings no larger than 2 by 4 inches (5.1 by 10.2 cm).

==== Hog panel ====
Hog panels or cattle panels consist of heavy wire approximately 0.25 inches (6 mm) or more in diameter running horizontally and vertically, and welded at the intersections. The panels, which are sold in lengths of 16 or 8 feet (4.88 or 2.44 m) rather than in rolls, are rigid and self-supporting. No corner bracing is needed for panels, as they are not stretched, and there is no tension on the corner posts.

==== Chain link ====
Chain link fencing is occasionally used for some livestock containment. However, due to cost, it is not particularly common to fence large areas, where less expensive forms of woven wire are equally suitable. When used in small enclosures, it is easily deformed by livestock, resulting in high ongoing maintenance costs.

=== Electric fence ===
Electric fencing became widely available in the 1950s and has been used both for temporary fences and to improve the security of fences made of other materials. It is most commonly made using lightweight steel wire (usually 14–17 gauge) attached to posts with insulators made of porcelain or plastic. Synthetic web or rope with thin steel wires interwoven to carry the electrical charge has become popular in recent years, particularly where additional visibility is desired.

A fence charger places an electrical pulse from ground to the wire about once per second. The pulse is narrow and usually around 5–20 kV. Animals receive an uncomfortable but harmless shock when they contact the wire and learn to stay away from it.

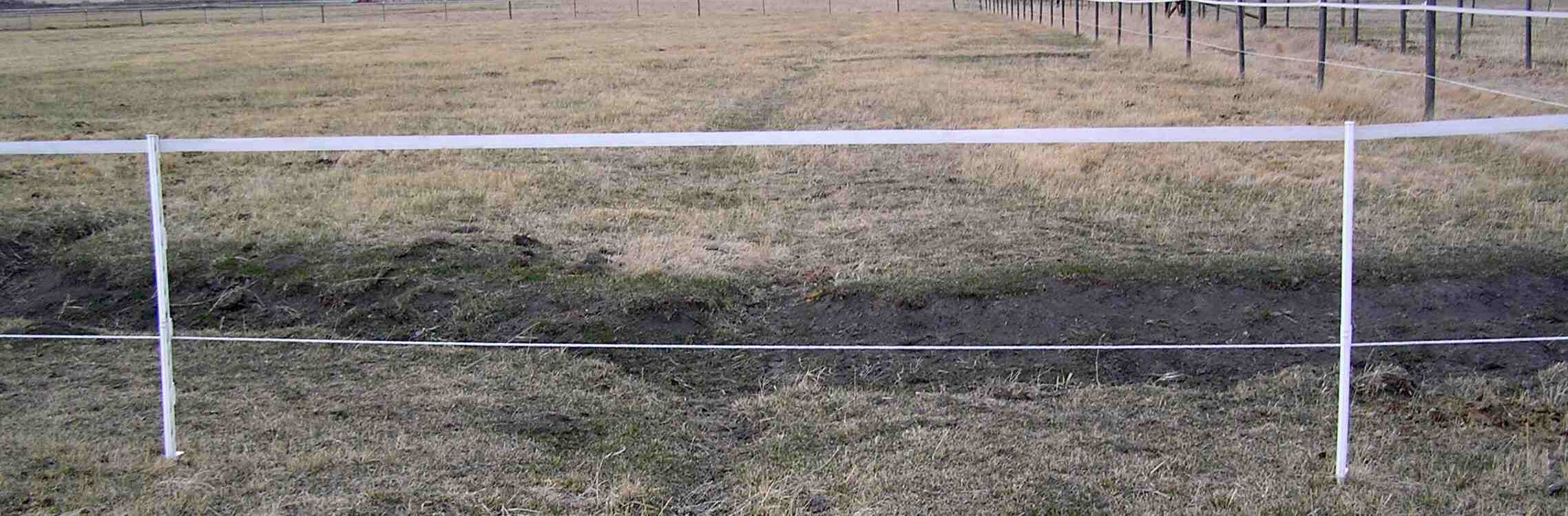
In addition to single strand wire, electric fencing is also made of synthetic materials with fine wire interwoven throughout the fence strands

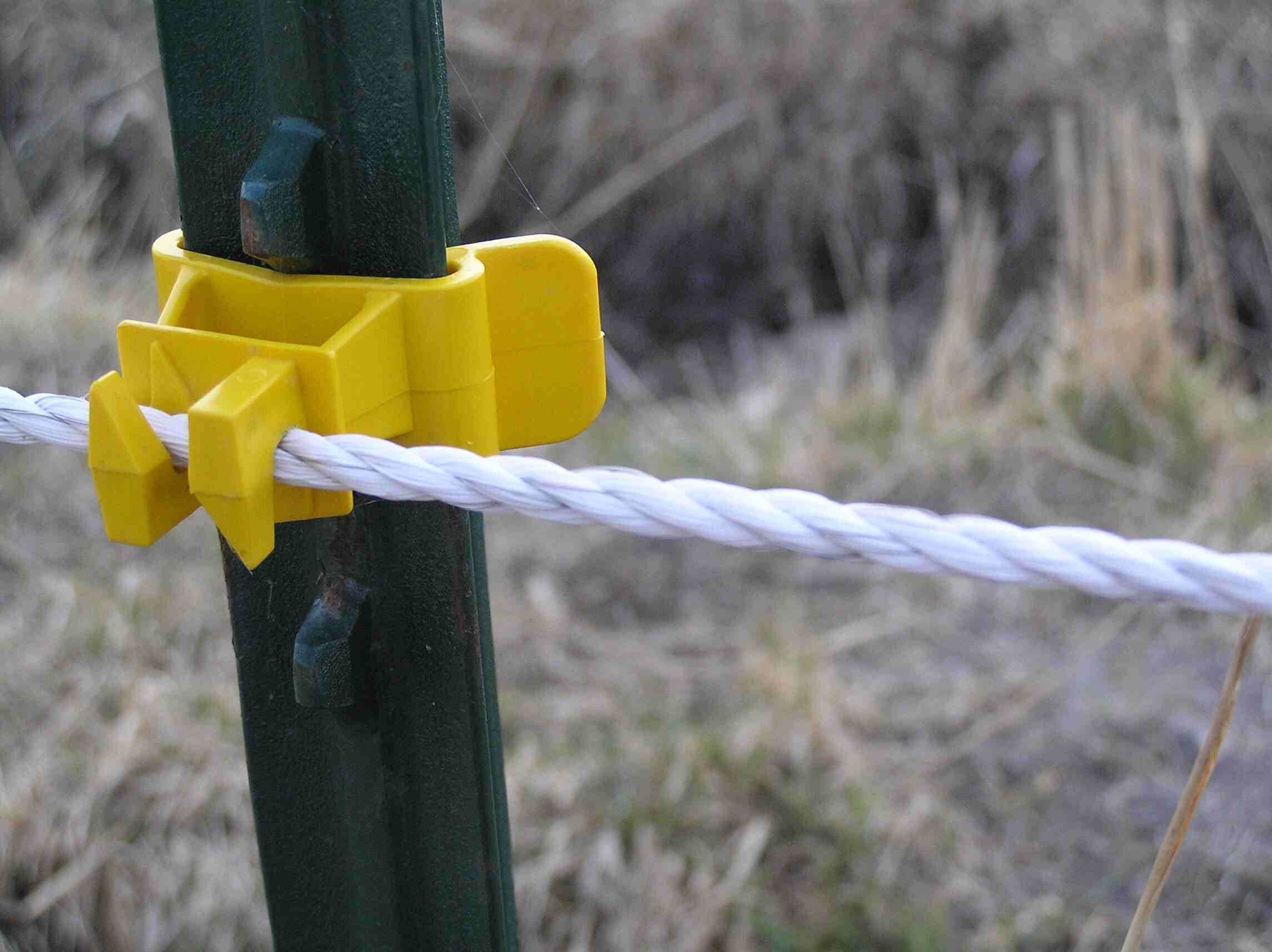
Detail of electric cord fence with metal interwoven with nylon cord, attached to a steel fence post with a plastic insulator

=== Synthetic fence ===
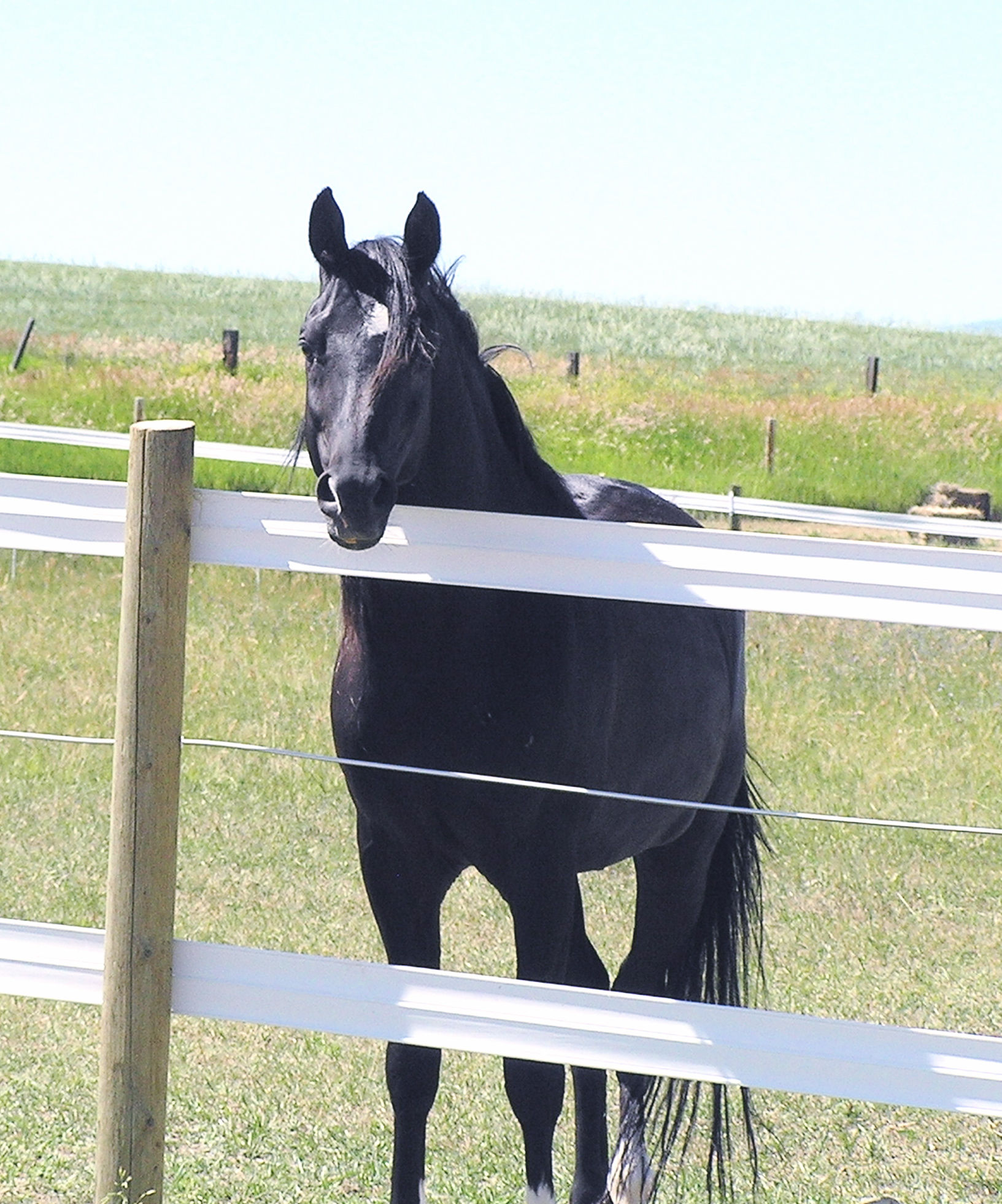
Horse behind vinyl fence consisting of two vinyl 3-wire "rails" and one vinyl-covered wire

Synthetic fence encompasses a wide range of products. Vinyl-coated wire fence is typically made from high-tensile wire. Some forms are non-electric; others incorporate layers of graphite to conduct current from the wire to the outer surface of the coated product, allowing the product to be electrified. It can be of any color, with white particularly common in the United States, so that the fencing is visible to livestock. Most forms can be installed on either wood posts or steel t-posts.

A variant, sometimes called "vinyl rail" or "strap fencing", consists of two or more vinyl-encased wires, with vinyl or another synthetic material between them, to create a "rail" that is anywhere from 1 to 10 centimetres (3/8 to 3 15/16 in) wide. Some forms may be electrified by use of a special coating on the top wire of the "rail."

A vinyl fence is installed similarly to a plain high-tensile fence and must be stretched tight. Strong bracing of posts at corners and in the middle of long fencelines is required. As with other wire fences, keeping vinyl fencing tightened regularly is key to safety and appearance.

A mesh form of vinyl fencing without internal wires is marketed as "deer fence" and used in some locations to augment other fencing to keep out wild animals. Some forms of vinyl fencing resemble vinyl-coated wire fencing but lack an internal wire and are marketed to livestock owners. They are marketed as particularly safe, but their strength in containing animals is under debate.

=== Wood, pipe, and other materials ===
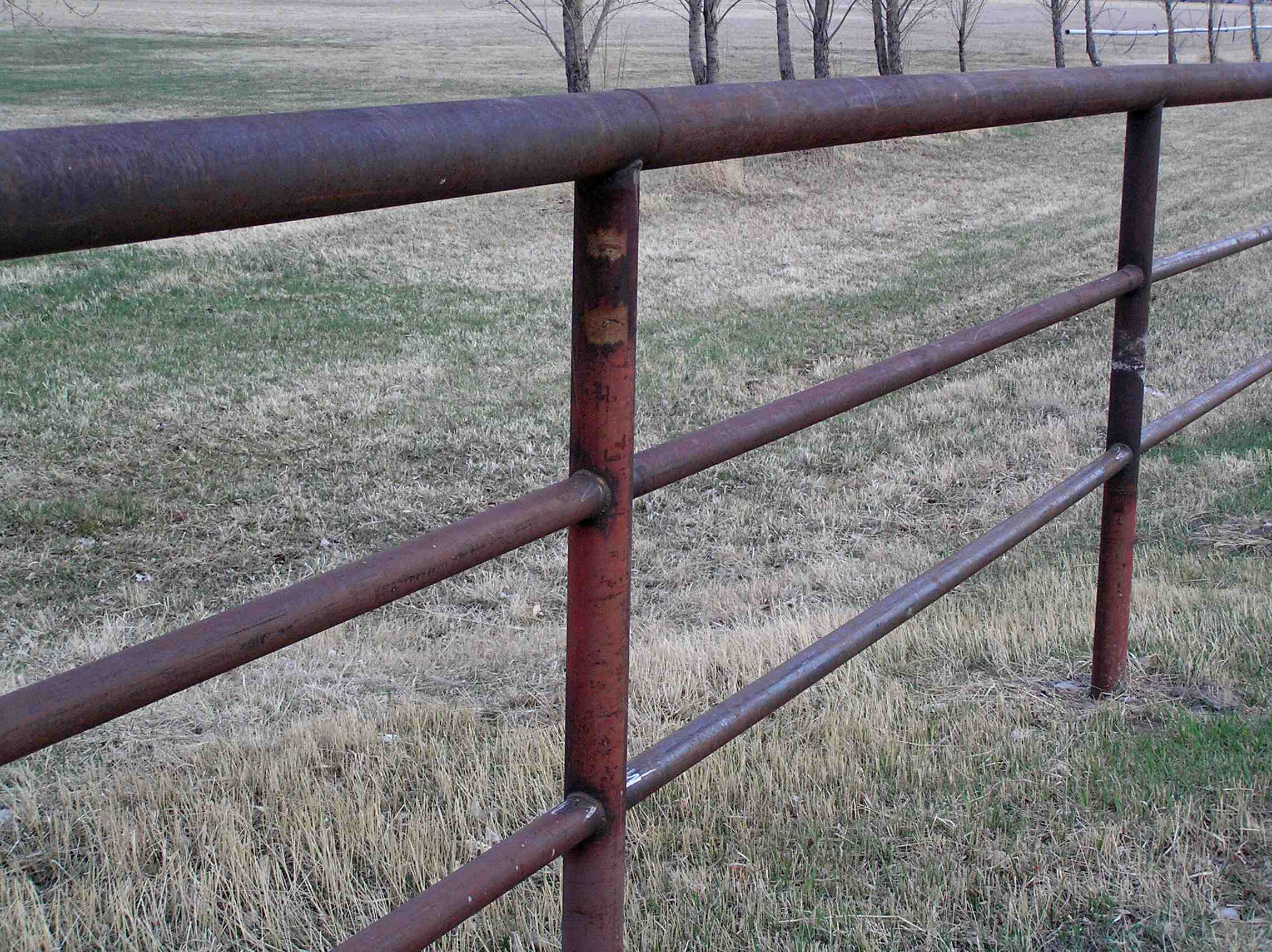
A pipe fence is very strong and will not break easily

Fences of wood, stranded cable, and pipe are used where cost is less of a consideration, particularly on horse farms, or in pens or corrals where livestock are likely to challenge the fence. Synthetic materials with wood-like qualities are also used, though they are the most expensive option in most situations. In some areas, these types of fencing materials can be cost-effective if plentiful. For example, scrap pipe is often easily obtained at a low price if oil fields are nearby, and wooden rails can sometimes be harvested from the owner's own land if it contains suitable standing timber.

A cattle grid is an obstacle used to prevent livestock, such as sheep, cattle, pigs, horses, or mules from passing along a road or railway that penetrates the fencing surrounding an enclosed piece of land or border.

== Maintenance ==
All types of agricultural fencing require regular maintenance to ensure their effectiveness. Cattle and horses are strong enough to break through most types of fence, and occasionally do so when frightened or motivated by hunger, thirst, or sex drive. Weather, flood, fire, and damage from vandals or motor vehicle accidents can do similar damage and may allow livestock to escape.

== Wildlife issues ==
A kangaroo trapped in ringlock or "sheep" fencing.

All types of livestock fencing can be barriers and traps for wildlife, causing injuries and fatalities. Wildlife can get their legs tangled in barbed wire or woven wire with a strand of barbed wire on top. Woven wire can barricade animals that cannot jump the fence but are too large to crawl through the holes, such as fawns, bears, and bobcats. Some wire fences are difficult for larger, fast-moving birds to see, and collisions can lead to entanglement.

Adding visibility to wire fences can help reduce wildlife collisions. Reducing the height of woven and strand wire fences to no more than 40 inches (102 cm) can make it easier for wildlife to jump over with less risk of entanglement. Using barbless wires on top and bottom reduces cuts on wildlife that crawl under strand fences or those that try to climb over.

Fladry lines, made of cloth, metal, or other materials, are sometimes used on fences to discourage wolves from entering a livestock enclosure.

Deer and many goats can easily jump an ordinary agricultural fence, and so special fencing is needed for farming goats or deer, or to keep wild deer out of farmland and gardens. Deer fence is often made of lightweight woven wire netting nearly 2 metres (6 feet 7 inches) high on lightweight posts, otherwise made like an ordinary woven wire fence. In areas where such a tall fence is unsuitable (for example, on mountains subject to very high winds), deer may be excluded (or contained) by a fence of ordinary height (about 1.5 metres [4 feet 11 inches]), with a smaller one of about 1 metre (3 feet 3 inches) high, about 1 metre (3 feet 3 inches) away from it, on the same side as the deer. The additional width prevents deer from approaching the fence close enough to jump it.

== See also ==
- Dingo Fence
- Hampshire gate
- Pet fence
- Rabbit-proof fence
- Roundpole fence
- Temporary fencing
- Wallrow
