= Split-rail fence =

Type of fence made of split timber logs

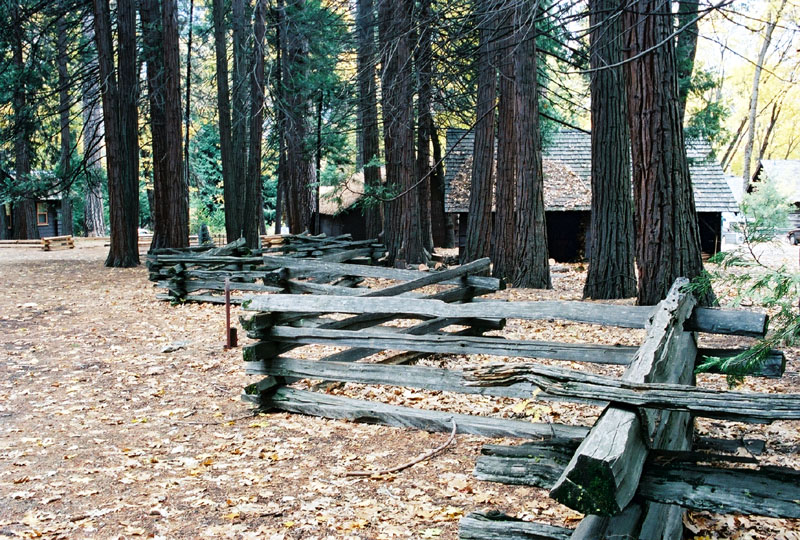
Simple split-rail fence

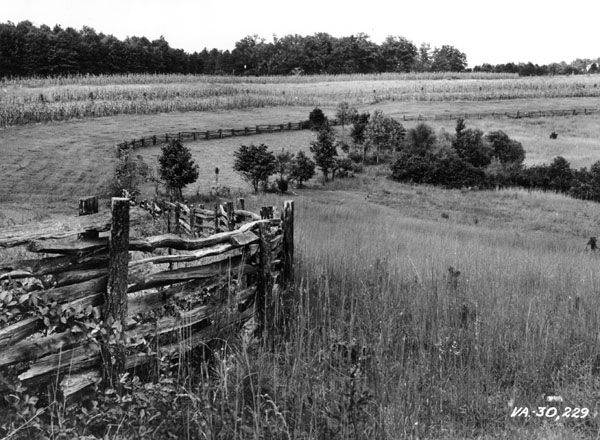
Log fence with double posts (photo taken in 1938)

A split-rail fence, log fence, or buck-and-rail fence (also historically known as a Virginia, zigzag, worm, snake or snake-rail fence due to its meandering layout) is a type of fence constructed in the United States and Canada, and is made out of timber logs, usually split lengthwise into rails and typically used for agricultural or decorative fencing. Such fences require much more timber than other types of fences, and so are generally only common in areas where wood is abundant.

They are simple in their construction, and can be assembled with few tools even on hard or rocky ground. They also can be built without using any nails or other hardware; such hardware was often scarce in frontier areas. They are popular in very rocky areas where post hole digging is difficult. They can be partially or wholly disassembled if the fence needs to be moved or the wood becomes more useful for other purposes.

Although the origin of split-rail fence use in colonial America is not fully known, it is thought likely that the concept and construction methods were first brought to America by the Forest Finn colonists in 17th century New Sweden. In turn, Finnish split-rail fencing can be traced to Savonian–Karelian Finns and the Sámi people.

== Material ==
Split rail fences were made of easy to split, rot-resistant wood. Traditionally American chestnut was the timber of choice until chestnut blight eliminated this tree. Currently, most split rails are made from cedar.

== Construction ==
Logs are typically cut to a length of 10 to 12 feet (3.0 to 3.7 m) and split down the length of the log. Each half is then split into quarters, then eighths, and so on until the rails were of a usable size. A log may produce from four rails from an 8-inch (20 cm) log to over a dozen from larger logs. The rails are stacked on top of one another. Most split rail fences have the rails stacked in an interlocking zig-zag fashion that is self-supporting, easy to create, easy to repair, and easy to disassemble.

Some timber fences have the rails stacked directly on top of each other and secured with double fence posts (one on either side of the rails). This made a more permanent and compact fence but remained easy to repair.

The distance between either the zigs or the zags is generally 16.5 feet (5 m) or one rod. The area of a field can therefore be calculated by counting zigs or zags along the side and end of the field: 160 square rods is 1-acre (0.40 ha).

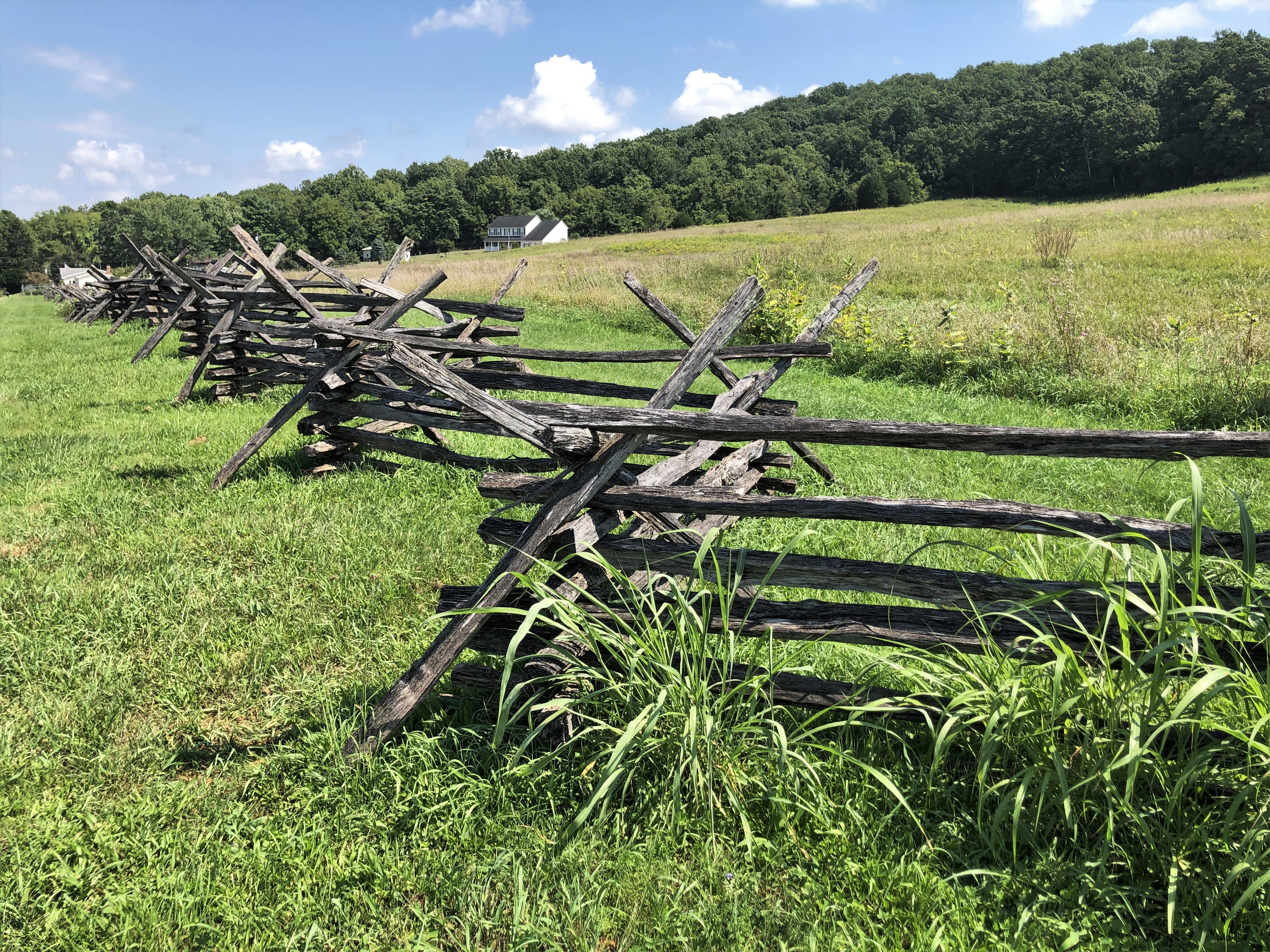
A buck-and-rail fence on a preserved Civil War battlefield in West Virginia

== Buck-and-rail fence ==
A buck-and-rail (also called buck-and-post) fence is a timber rail fence in a three-dimensional A-frame shape. Each section of fencing consists of two standing vertical A-frames, between which are four to seven horizontal rails or poles, the number depending on the height of fencing wanted. In modern fences, the length of the rails is about 10 feet (3.0 m). Except at the end of the fence, each A-frame is used by two horizontal sections, one to the right, and one to the left. For the enclosure of livestock such as cows and sheep, a four-foot (1.2 m) high fence using four rails is sufficient. Taller fences of 6–7 feet (1.8–2.1 m) are required for big game such as deer and elk, as the three-dimensional structure of the fence discourages jumping over it; a 9–10 foot (2.7–3.0 m) wire fence would be needed for the same purpose.

Buck-and-rail fencing was ubiquitous in battlefields in the Eastern Theater of the American Civil War, because of the proximity of forested land and their ease of construction. These split rail fences were a major source of firewood for both the Union and Confederate armies.

Buck-and-rail fences can keep larger animals in or out, while smaller wildlife can pass through them easily, and they can be readily climbed over by people.

A mortised split-rail fence in suburban America, built in 1999

== Mortised fence ==
In the United Kingdom (and increasingly in suburban America) a different style of split-rail fence is used. This is not free-standing but consists of vertical posts placed in the ground, having holes (mortises) in each side into which the roughly pointed ends of split rails (usually of sweet chestnut) are placed. No zig-zagging is necessary. This style is commonly used as decorative fencing, or for horse-keeping. Such fences are a specific type of a more general form, called post-and-rail fences.

== Patent cedar fence ==
In Canada an attempt was made to patent several cedar fence designs. These styles became known as Patent Cedar Fences, also called Patent Fences or Patent Rail Fences. The use of two rails to form a cross, having a top rail, bench rails and lower heavier rails, allowed it to be free standing, withstand heavy winds and take up less fence bottom than the zigzag or snake fence.

== See also ==
- Roundpole fence
