= Roundpole fence =

Type of fence

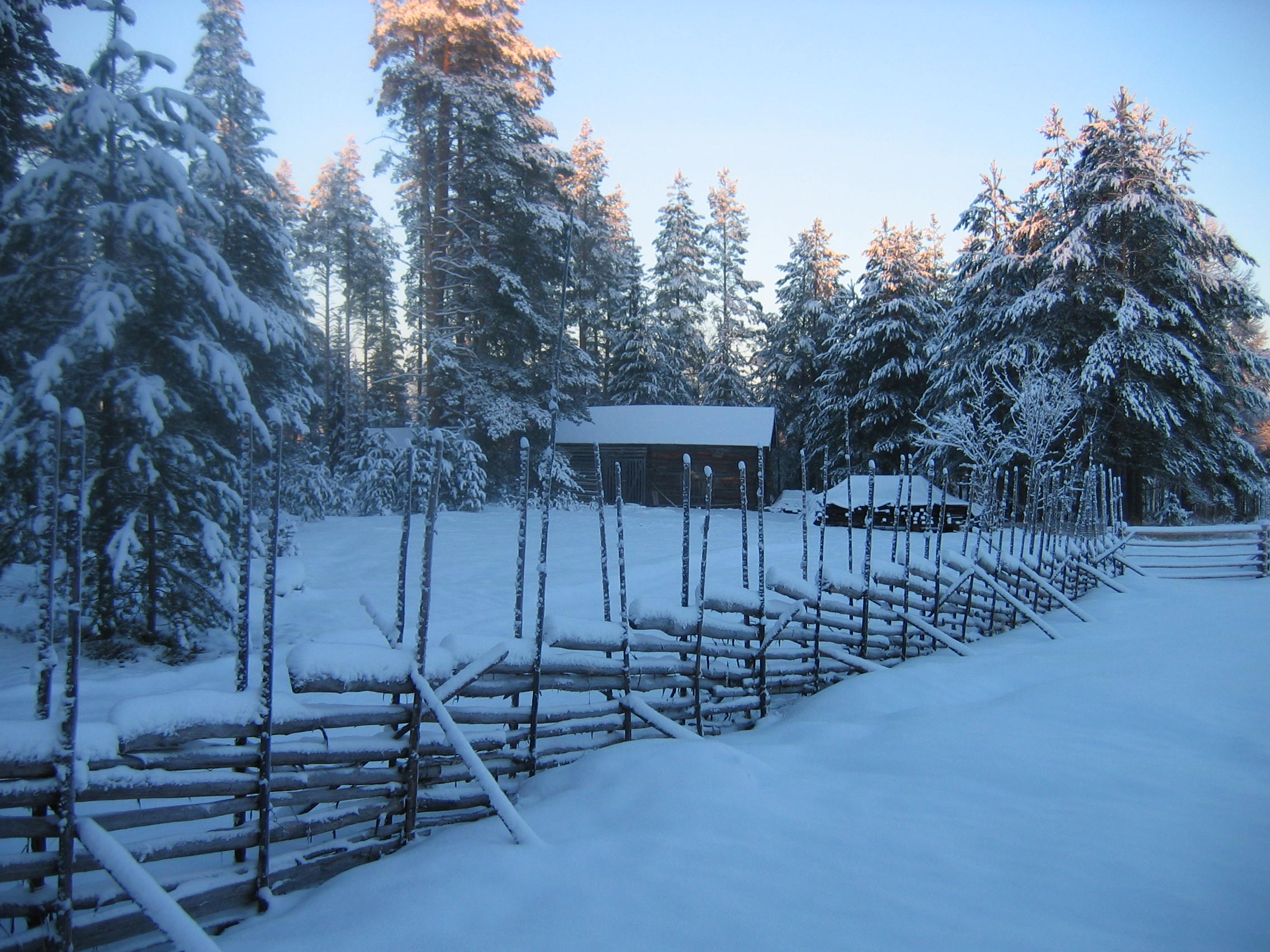
Wooden pole fence with diagonal support rods in Utajärvi, Finland.

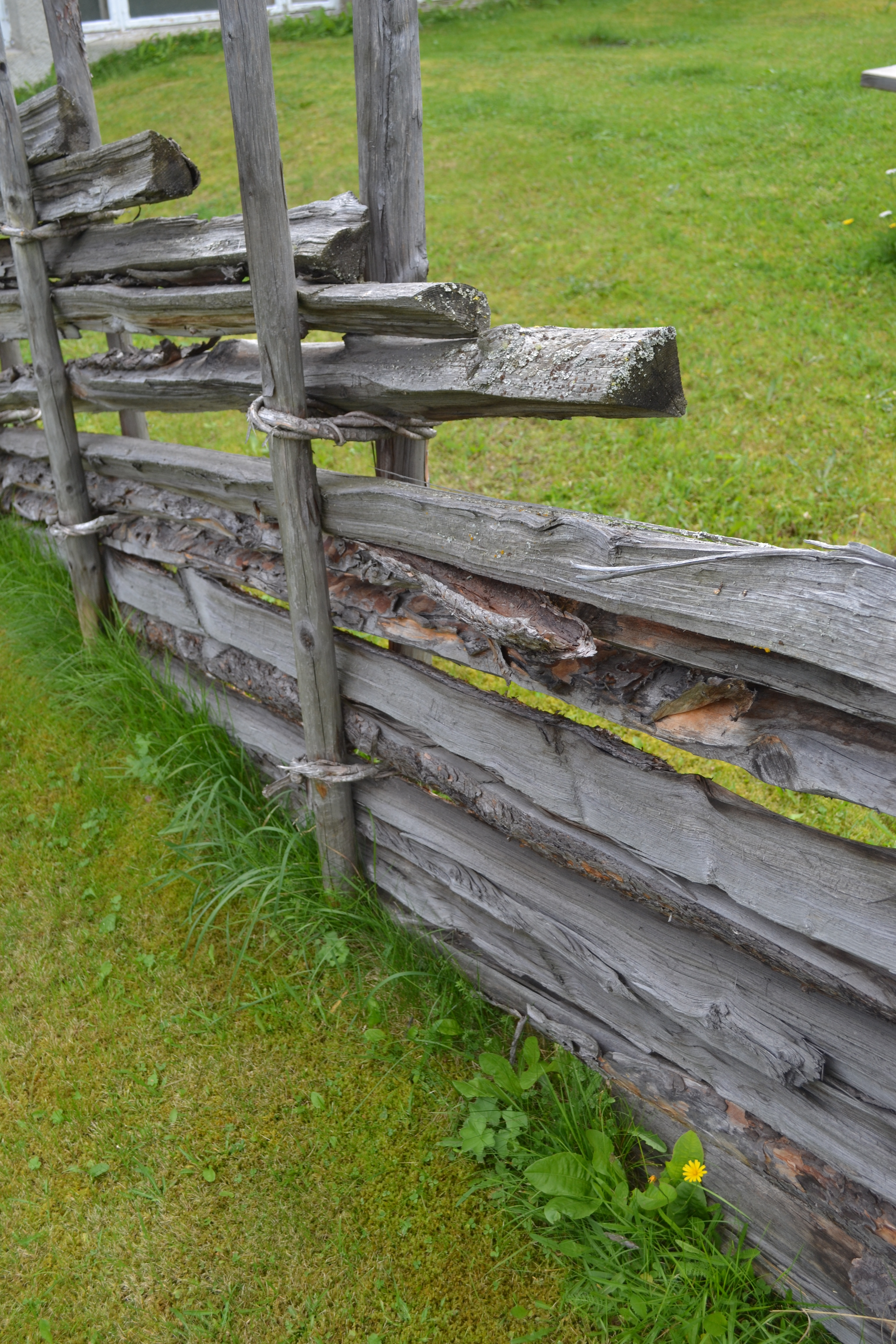
Detail of a traditional Norwegian skigard with slanting rails of split spruce between pairs of upright poles. Hjerleid school in Dovre Municipality.

The roundpole fence is a wooden fence typical to the countryside in Sweden, Norway, Finland and Estonia (Swedish: gärdesgård; Norwegian: skigard; Finnish: riukuaita, risuaita, or pistoaita; Estonian: roigasaed or teivasaed). It is normally made from unbarked and unsplit youngish trees, mostly spruce or juniper. Roundpole fences have traditionally been used as a means of fencing off animals rather than marking property boundaries.

The fence construction generally consists of 3 or 4 parts: uprights put together in pairs, round poles laid horizontally or diagonally between the two uprights, and binding cord usually made from young saplings - and sometimes also diagonal bracing. The fence is usually 1.5–2 metres tall. The fencing can also incorporate specially made stiles and gates. The fence requires an abundance of wood, which was never a problem in Scandinavia, as the trees generally came from the owners' own forests in the process of thinning them out. The term ″roundpole fence" is somewhat misleading, as the rails between the pairs of uprights are usually split spruce logs. However, the upright poles are always round, young spruce trees with a diameter of 5 to 7 cm. For the diagonals, larger trees with a diameter up to 20 cm were split into four or eight rails of suitable dimensions. Very young saplings were used to bind the rails to the uprights, the idea being to utilize trees of different ages. In more recent times, rough sawn boards have also been used, preferably the outer boards of a log, with one curved side. The binding of saplings have also been replaced by steel wire.

The oldest known roundpole fence dates back to the Iron Age. The oldest known archeological find of a roundpole fence in Sweden was uncovered in Leksand.

== Legislation as a cause of rail fences’ popularity ==
Swedish law has required—from the provincial laws of the 13th century to today’s Act (1933:269) on the Protection of Property—that arable fields and meadows be secured by enclosures. This obligation to fence is one of the main reasons why the gärdesgård (traditional split-rail fence) became agriculture’s most common fence type.

== Gallery ==
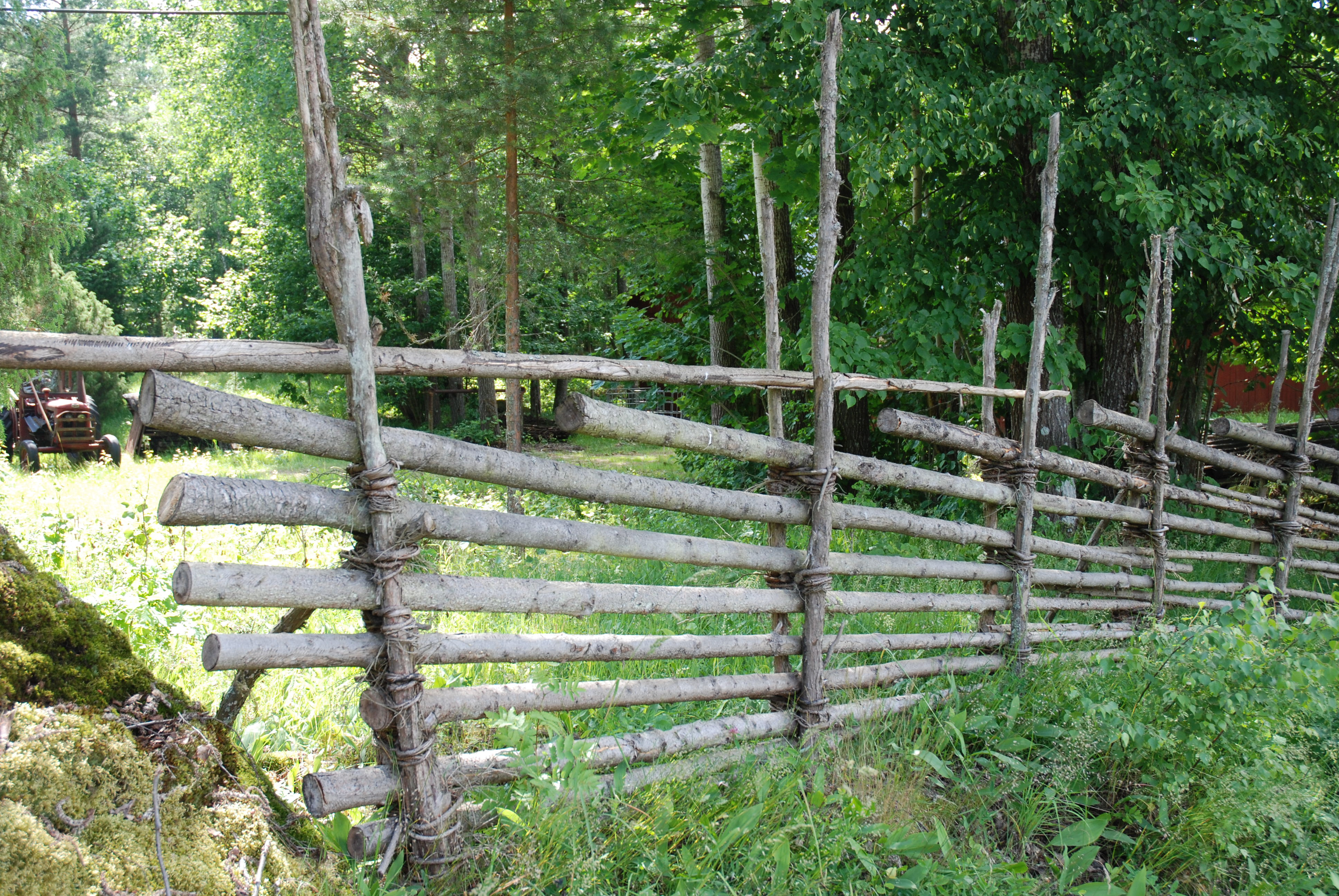
Wooden pole fence in Småland, Sweden

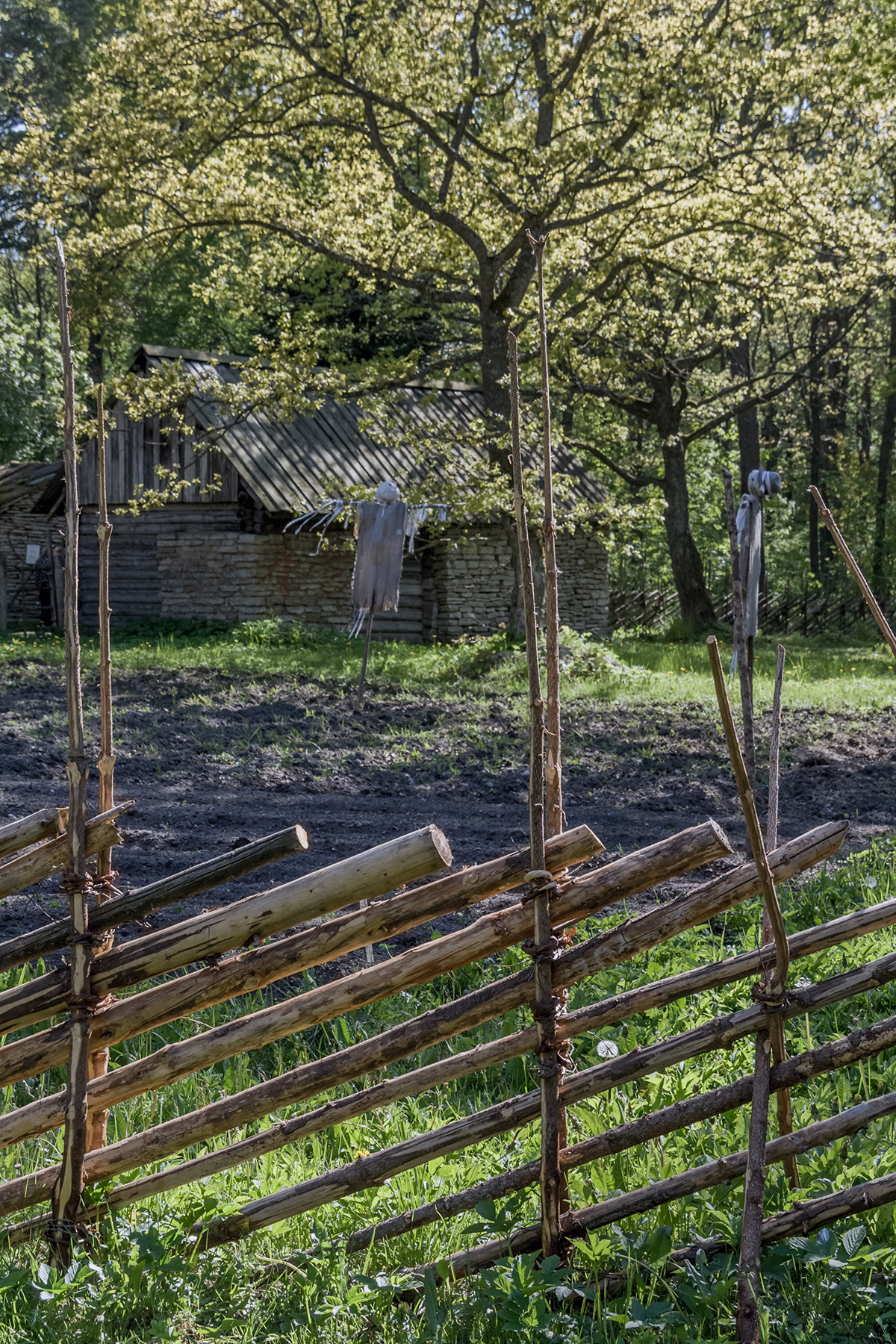
Roundpole fence in Estonian Open Air Museum, Estonia

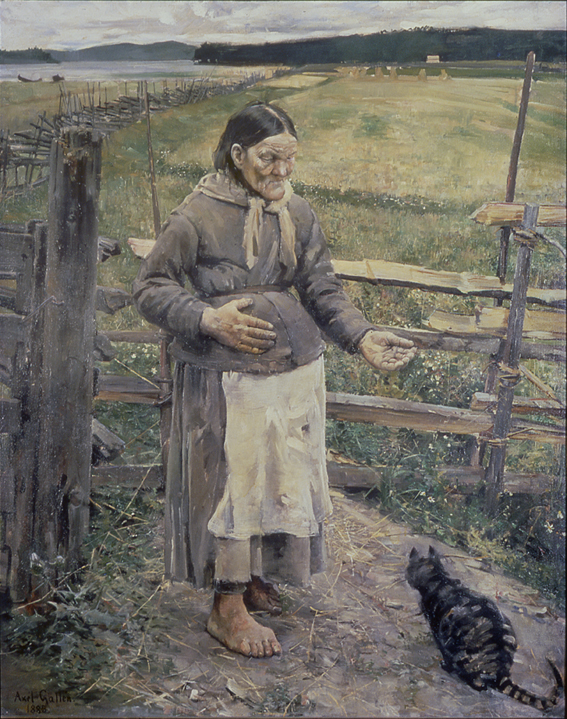
Roundpole fence featured in a painting by Finnish painter Akseli Gallen-Kallela titled "Old woman and a cat", 1885

== See also ==
- Agricultural fencing
- Split-rail fence
- Coat-of-arms of Gjerdrum municipality, Norway
