= 2009 Millennium Point stampede =

Crowd crush in Birmingham, England

The 2009 Millennium Point Concert Stampede was a crowd crush incident which occurred during a November 15, 2009 holiday event outside of the Millennium Point complex in Birmingham, United Kingdom. Hundreds of people broke through a temporary crowd control barrier causing various injuries to fans during the annual Christmas Lights Switch-On event, while the band JLS were performing.

== The event ==
The free event, organised by 96.4FM BRMB and Birmingham City Council, was to start at 2 pm, followed by the Christmas Lights Switch-on at 7.30 pm and finishing with a fireworks display.

The Secretary of State for Culture, Olympics, Media and Sport Ben Bradshaw and the city council's Cabinet Member for Leisure, Sport & Culture, Martin Mullaney blamed the tragedy on bad weather and a failure of the fencing for the incident. However, local MP for Perry Barr, Khalid Mahmood pointed toward the Birmingham City Council's lack of preparedness. Steve Hollingworth, assistant director of sports and events at Birmingham City Council said the event had been organised and prepared properly. Mahmood said the council should have made access to the event by ticket-holders only, and that ticketless fans should not have been admitted and compared the situation to the 1989 Hillsborough football stadium disaster, where 96 Liverpool fans were crushed to death.

All parties agreed that the late surge of fans from outside of the main event was poorly handled and that the council could have erected plasma TV screens outside the event for those unable to get in.

An independent report by a health and safety consultant placed the final blame on Birmingham City Council's choice of fencing. The usual solid fencing was deemed unsafe in the high winds and so was replaced by see-through temporary fencing that morning. Despite this, the report concluded that pre-planning for the event was "satisfactory". It was believed that members of the public could see spaces in the crowds appearing through the see-through fence and decided to climb over, resulting in the fence collapsing and causing the subsequent surge and injuries.

== Council preparation ==
Because a free pop music concert and fireworks show was planned, sections of Millennium Point were fenced off. Either marshals and/or police were stationed at a few points so as to prevent any minor crimes, like pickpocketing. Trouble breaking out may have been contributed by party-goers becoming over-excited, plus the unofficial presence of alcohol.

Birmingham City Councillor Martin Mullaney later stated it was a failure of the fencing at Millennium Point which was the main problem, since the wind broke the solid-steel fencing down during the night, and it was then replaced with Heras fencing, as used on building sites, and extra security personnel.

According to reports, about 20,000 to 21,000 (officially) or 27,000 people (police estimates) arrived for the show at Millennium Point, which had been expecting to attract just 5,000 fans, not the 15,000 and 20,000 Birmingham City Council had expected to arrive. The venue had a capacity of 5,000 people, and it was recognised that things would become overcrowded.
