= Chicane =

Curves added to a road to slow traffic

A chicane (/ʃɪˈkeɪn/) is a serpentine curve in a road, added by design rather than dictated by geography. Chicanes add extra turns and are used both in motor racing and on roads and streets to slow traffic for safety. For example, one form of chicane is a short, shallow S-shaped turn that requires the driver to turn slightly left and then slightly right to continue on the road, requiring the driver to reduce speed. The word chicane is derived from the French verb chicaner, which means "to create difficulties" or "to dispute pointlessly", "quibble", which is also the root of the English noun chicanery. The Spanish verb chicanear also means "to use trickery".

== Motor racing ==
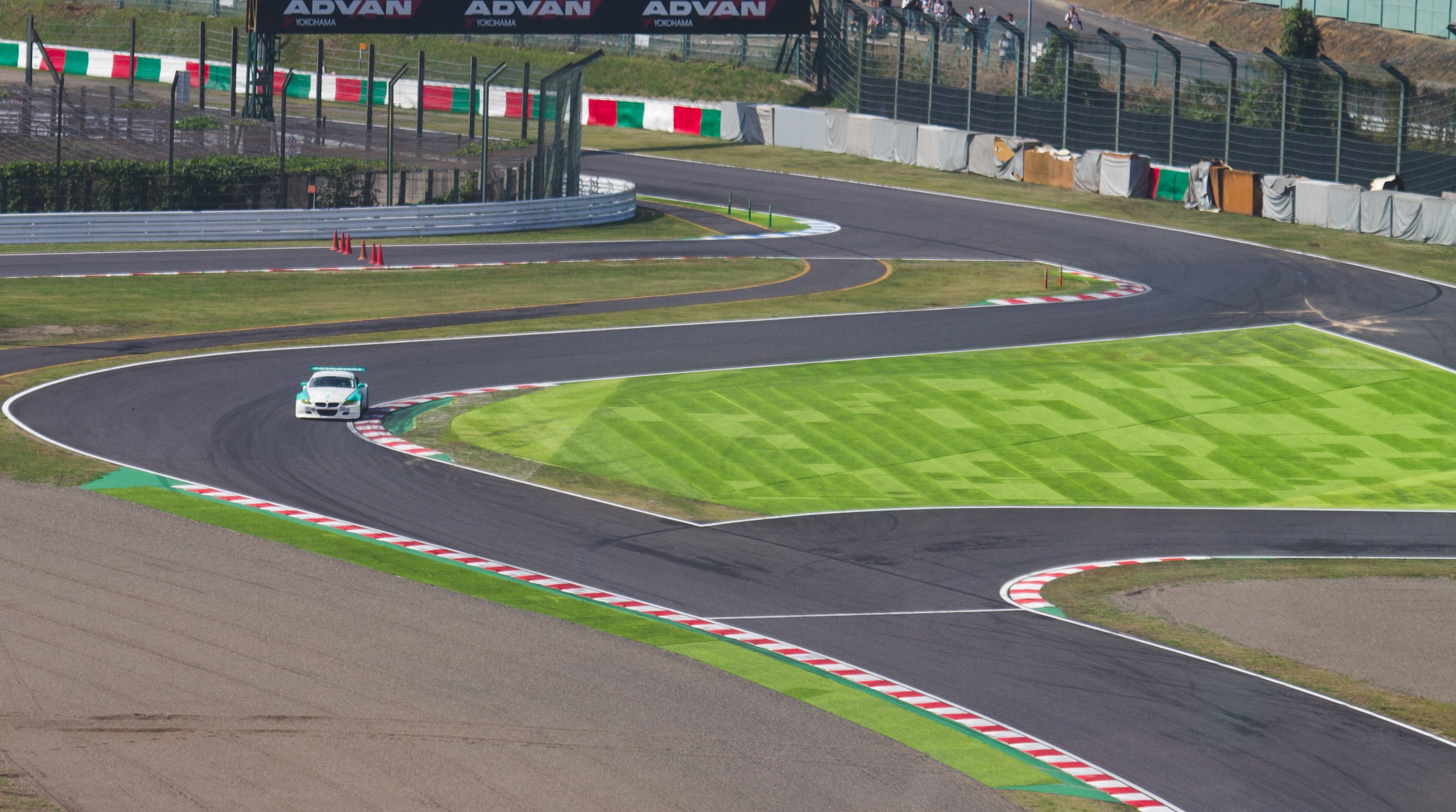
The Casio Triangle chicane on the Suzuka International Racing Course

On modern racing circuits, chicanes are usually located after long straights. Due to being preceded by heavy braking zones, they are regularly used as overtaking spots. They can be placed tactically by circuit designers to prevent vehicles from reaching speeds deemed to be unsafe. Examples of this include: three chicanes at the Autodromo Nazionale Monza, introduced in the early 1970s; the Chase at Mount Panorama, added in 1987; and the Tamburello chicane at Imola, which was placed in 1995 after Ayrton Senna's death at the original corner. At Le Mans in 1990, two chicanes were placed on the 6 kilometres (3.7 mi) Mulsanne Straight where Group C prototypes had previously achieved speeds of 400 kilometres per hour (250 mph) in order to conform to new international regulations limiting the maximum length of a straight on a motor racing circuit to 2 kilometres (1.2 mi). Chicanes can make slipstreaming less potent. The term is used in other types of racing, such as bobsleigh, to indicate a similar shift in the course or track.

A slower driver or vehicle that delays competitors is sometimes disparaged as a mobile chicane or moving chicane. In some cases they may not move out of the way quickly enough to allow competitors in higher positions (having completed more laps) past, despite repeated showings of blue flags. This can cost competitors valuable time and championship points.

== Traffic calming ==
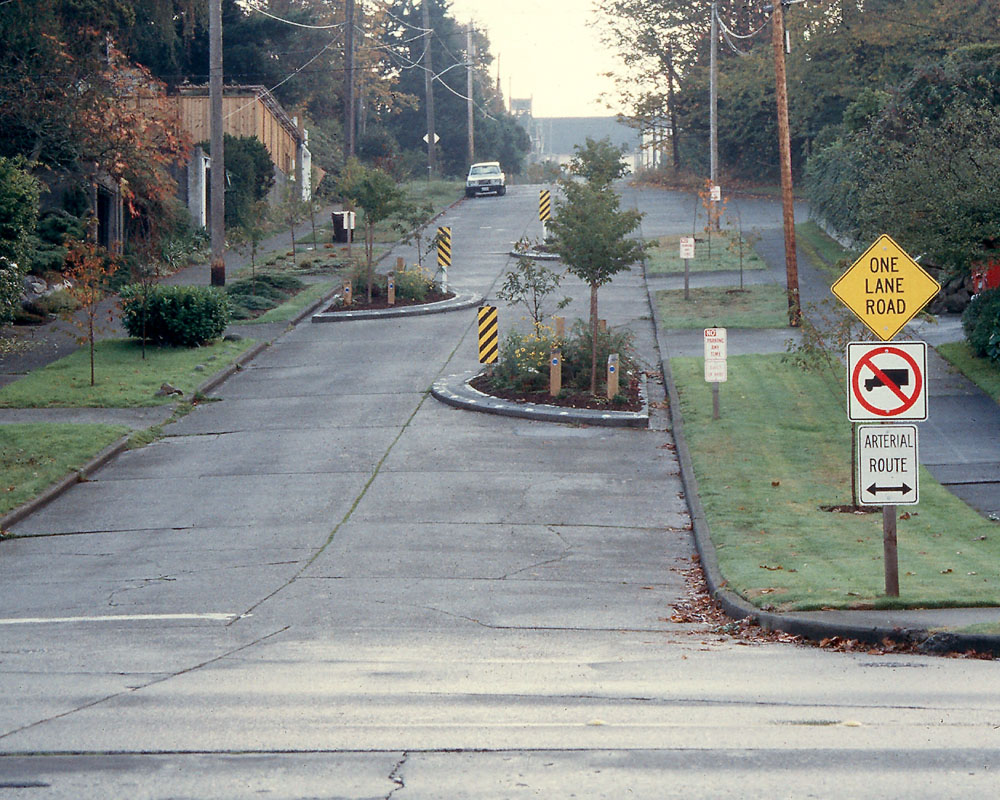
Chicanes used for traffic calming

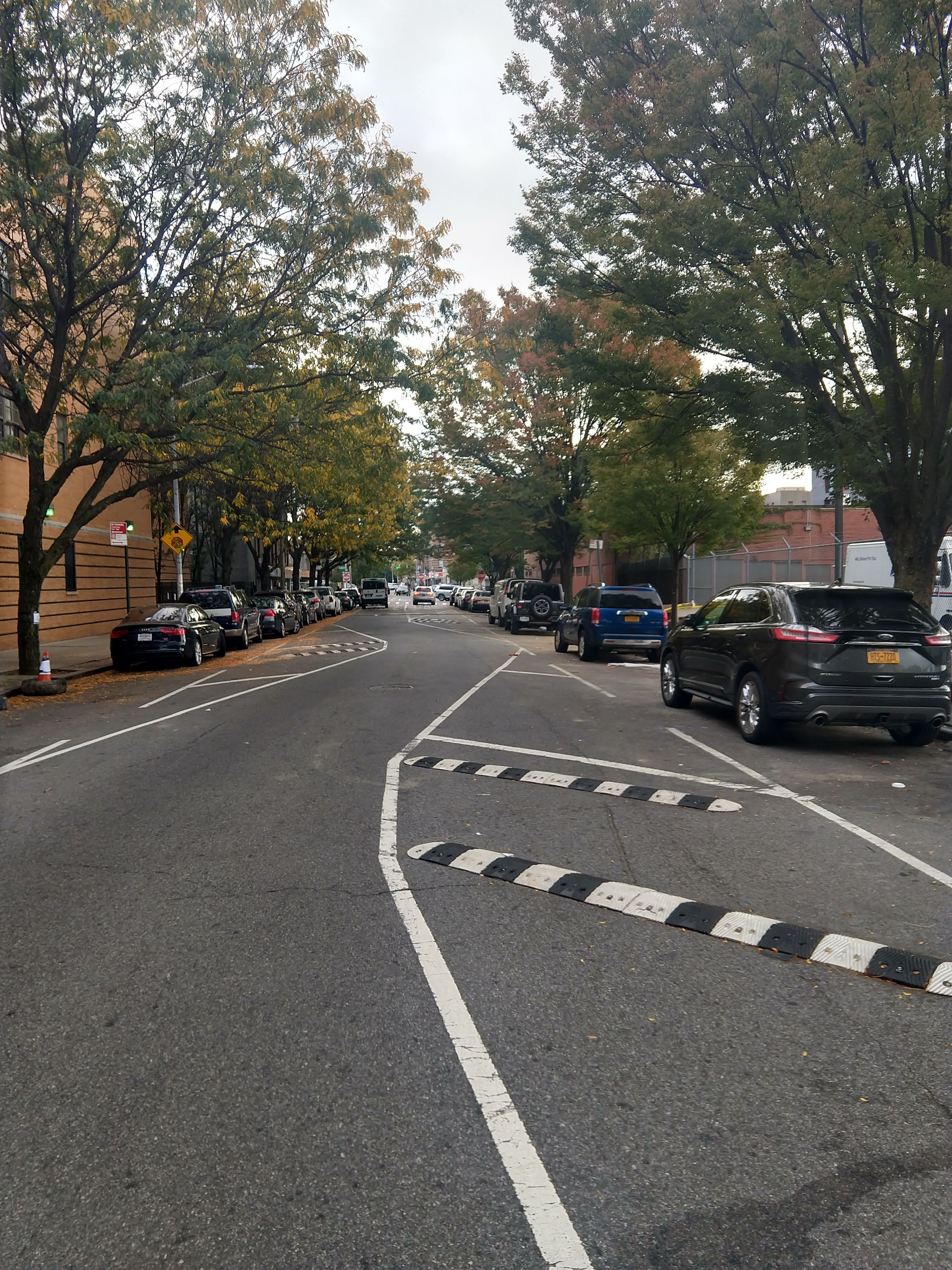
Another type of traffic-calming chicane

Chicanes are a type of "horizontal deflection" used in traffic-calming schemes to reduce the speed of traffic. Drivers are expected to reduce speed to negotiate the lateral displacement in the vehicle path. There are several variations of traffic-calming chicanes, but they generally fall into one of two broad categories:

- Single-lane working chicanes, which consist of staggered build-outs, narrowing the road to the extent that traffic travelling in one direction has to give way to opposing traffic
- Two-way working chicanes, which use build-outs to provide deflection, but with lanes separated by road markings or by a central island.

Limited crash-data for chicane schemes indicate changes in injury crashes (range from −54% to +32%) and crash severity.

Chicanes can also be used to prevent access to certain vehicles. The Vermont Agency of Transportation has considered adding chicanes to Route 108 in Stowe and Cambridge to prevent the passage of tractor-trailers, which often get stuck further up the road.

== Pedestrian ==
A pedestrian chicane is a kind of permanent fence used at a railway crossing to slow pedestrians down and to force them to observe both directions before crossing the railway tracks. While passing the chicane, one has to turn to the left and to the right, increasing the probability of seeing an approaching train. A similar arrangement is sometimes used at the entrances of parks to impede bicycle, car, mobility scooter, and wheelchair access.

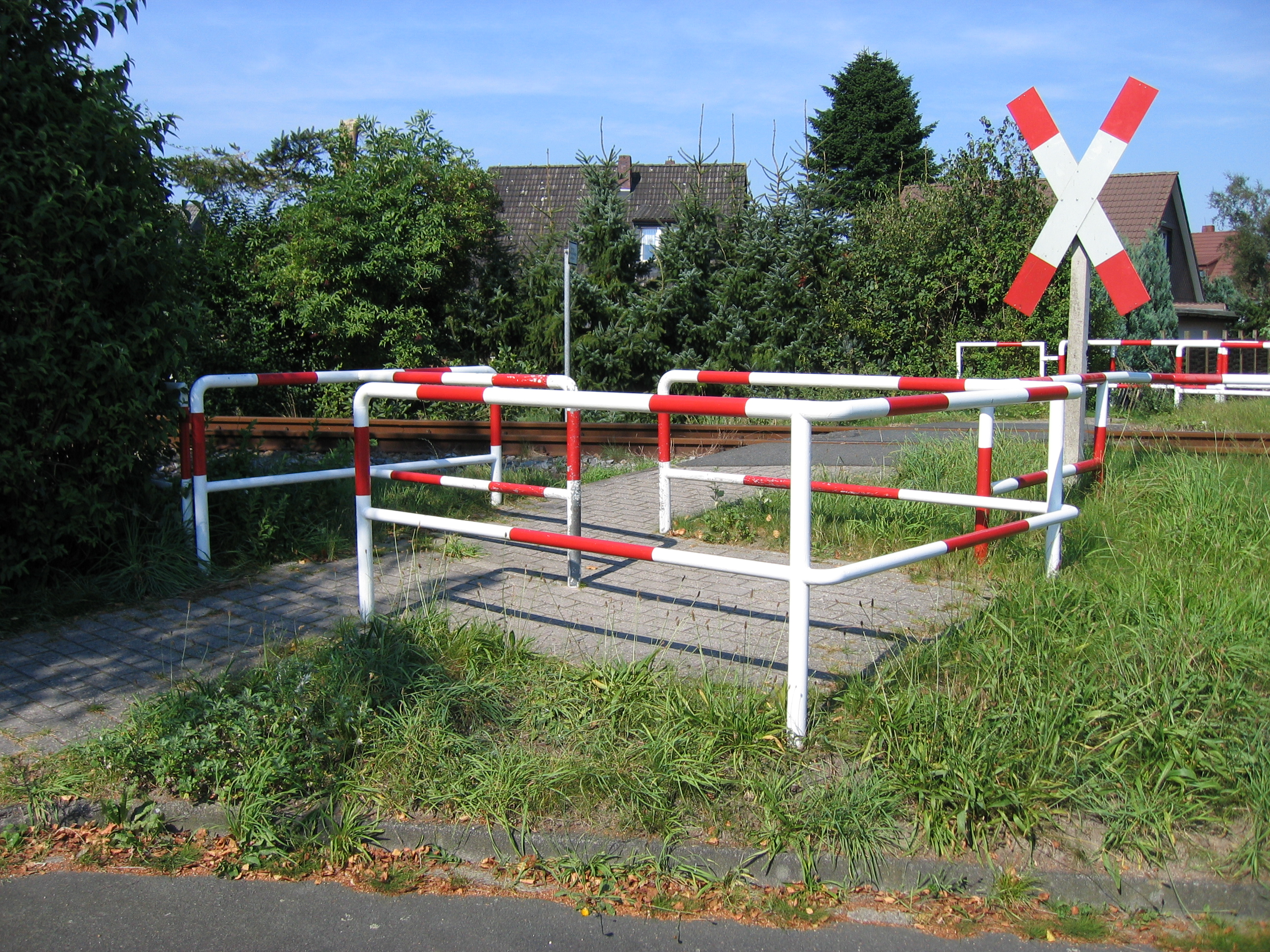
Chicane to prevent pedestrians from carelessly running across the track.

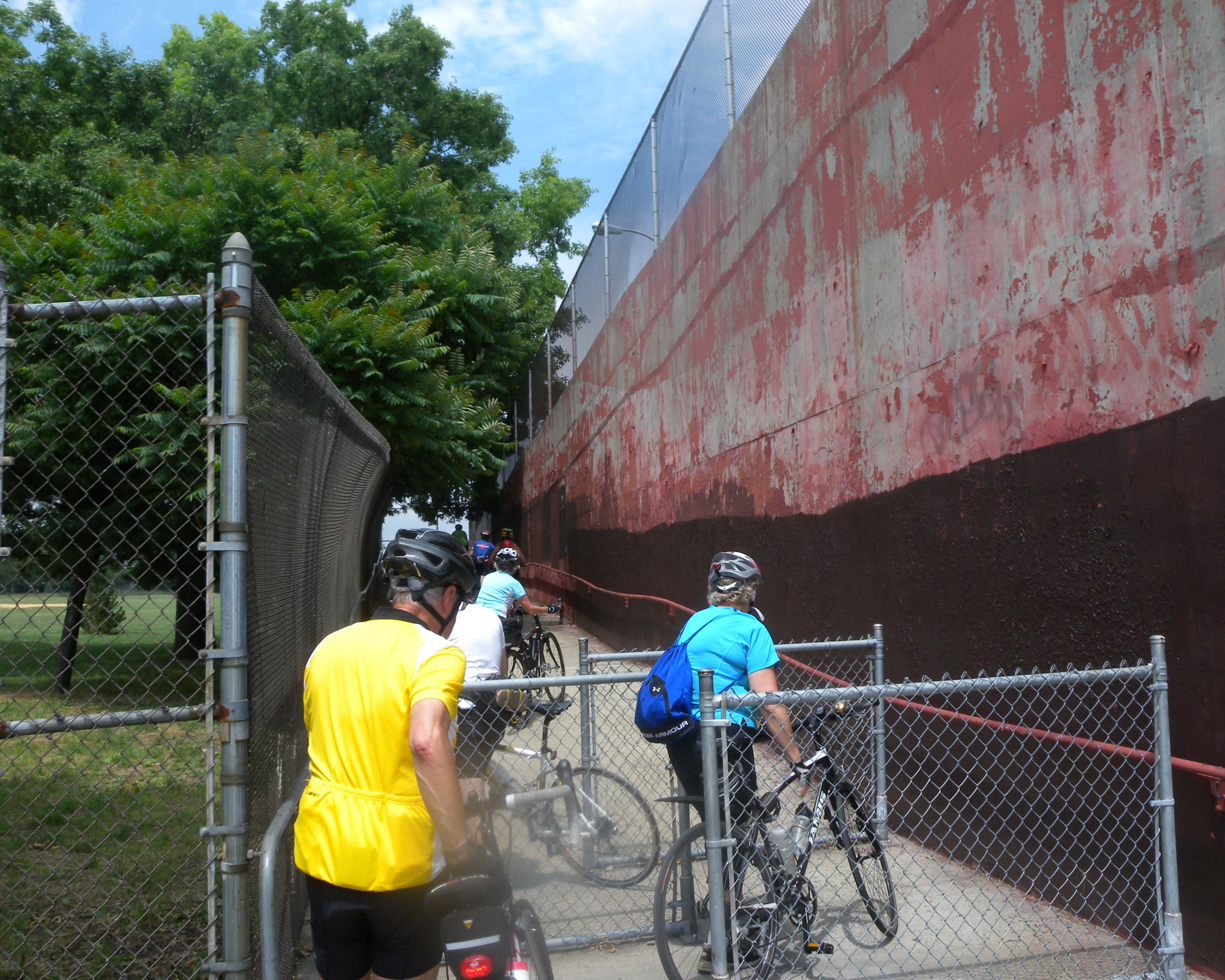
Chicane used for slowing cyclists

== See also ==
- Crowd control barrier
- Jersey barrier
- Traffic safety
