= Thavakkara Bus Terminal Kannur =

Indian bus terminal in Kerala

Thavakkara Bus Terminal Kannur താവക്കര ബസ്‌ ടെർമിനൽ കണ്ണൂർ
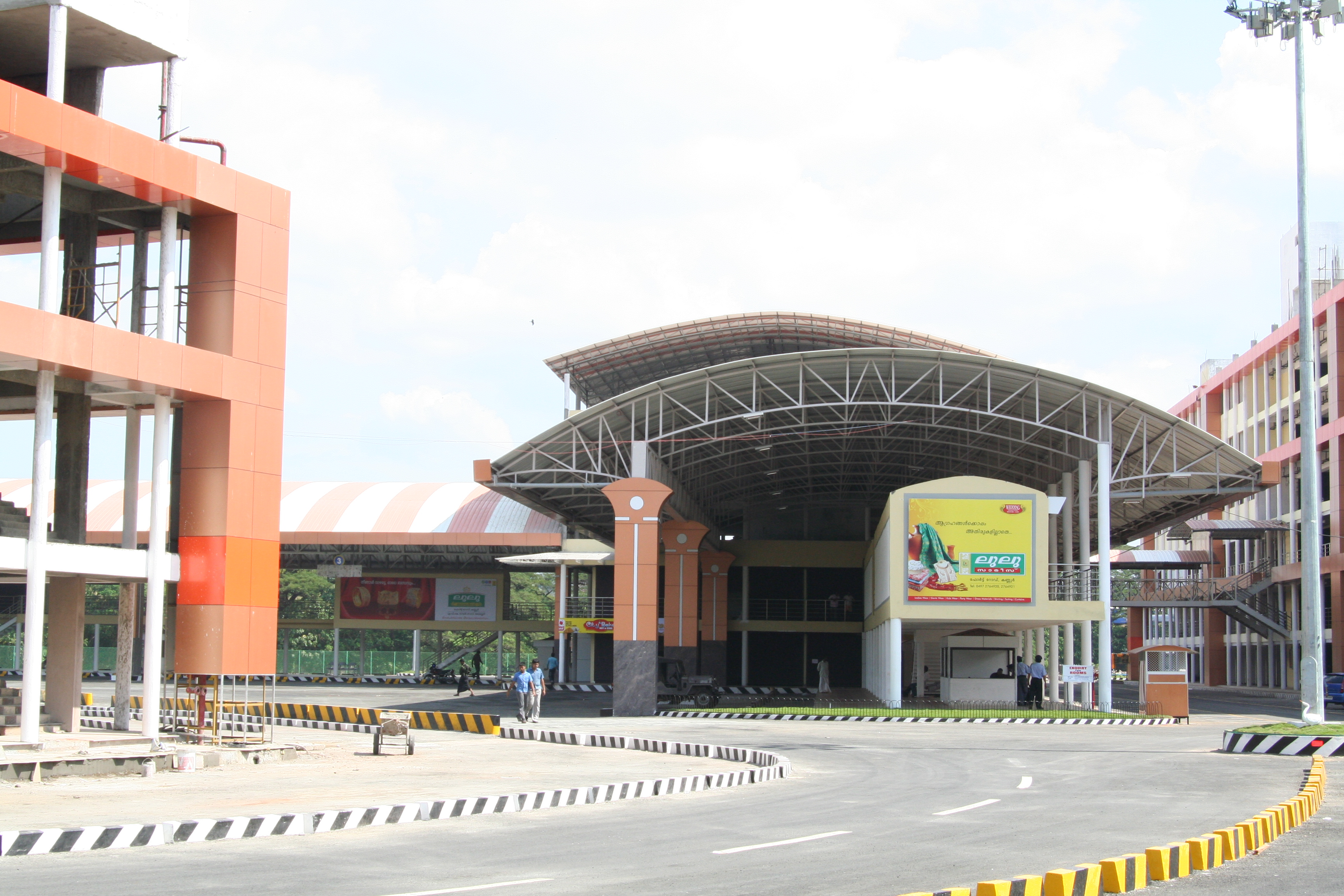
- Thavakkara Bus Terminal at Kannur

General information
- Location: Thavakkara, Kannur; India
- Coordinates: 11°52′03″N 75°22′14″E
- System: Bus Station
- Platforms: 53 bus bays

Construction
- Structure type: At grade
- Parking: Yes
Location

Thavakkara Bus Terminal, also called Kannur Central Bus Terminal or Central Bus Terminal Complex, is a bus station in Kannur, Kerala, India. It is located near to Kannur railway station. It is also India's first bus terminal to be developed on a build-operate- transfer (BOT) basis.

== Overview ==
The project is a joint venture of the Kannur Municipal Corporation and the KK Group, being implemented on Build-Operate-Transfer (BOT) concept. Most of the floors inside the terminal are marked for commercial purposes, which include central lobby, passengers waiting area and parking facilities.

=== Facilities ===
- Multiple Bus bays
- Parking Bay for Cars, Two Wheelers and Autorickshaws
- Food Courts
- Cloakroom
- Passenger Amenities

== Services ==
Thavakkara Bus Terminal, serves as the main boarding & alighting point in Kannur for all the passengers travelling outside city and state. It has buses catering to long distances services and short-distance buses.

There are many long-distance bus services which operates with in Kerala state and to various district headquarters. Interstate bus services towards Mangalore, Virajpet, Madikeri, Mysuru are also available from Thavakkara Bus Terminal.

The bus stand complex includes one luxury hotel, one budget hotel and one dormitory.
