= Pool fence =

Fence surrounding a swimming pool

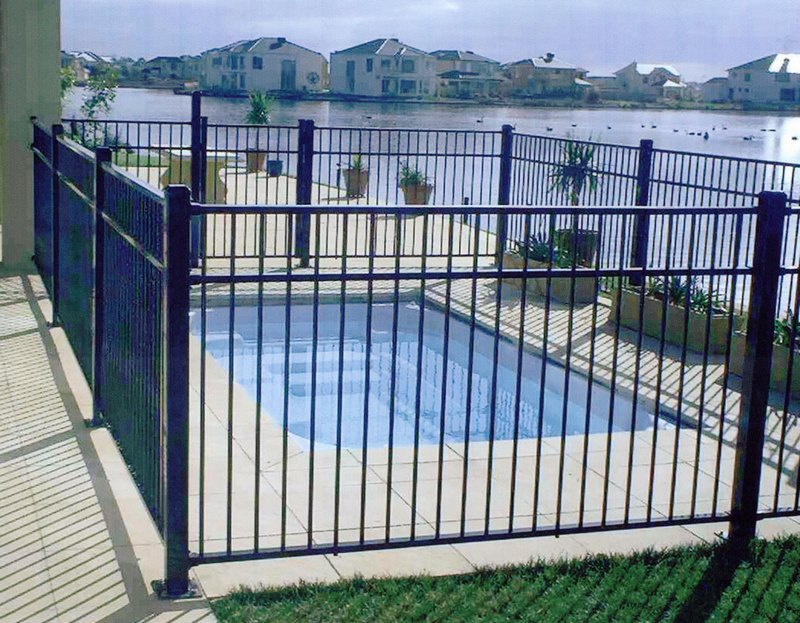
A backyard tubular steel pool fence in Victoria, Australia

A swimming pool fence is a type of fence placed around swimming pools, to create a passive barrier to restrict the access of small children to the swimming pool. Swimming pool fences must have a self-closing and self-latching gate/s to be compliant to most countries' laws and codes.

Swimming pool fences are designed so that young children cannot climb over them or go through them. They are manufactured to strict standards to be sturdy, durable and non-climbable.

Most countries design, manufacture and install swimming pool fences to the International Code Councils (ICC) guidelines.

== Types ==
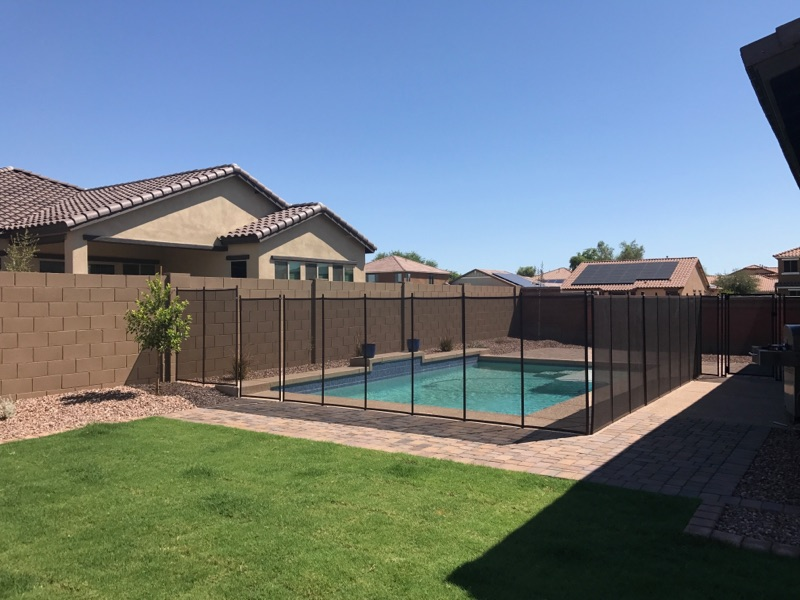
Newly installed removable mesh pool fence used to provide a protective barrier between children and the swimming pool

Swimming pool fences are manufactured in several different types, using a variety of materials.

- Aluminum
- Steel
- Glass
- Vinyl / PVC fencing
- Mesh

They can be slotted to allow visibility or solid for privacy.

== Swimming pool barrier regulations ==
Countries, states and municipalities within countries have different laws regarding swimming pool fencing laws, ranging from no laws at all to very strict laws and inspection programmes.

=== Australia ===
Starting from 2010 all states and territories in Australia are in various stages of reviewing their swimming pool fencing laws, requiring swimming pools to be registered with a state body and the implementation of a timed swimming pool barrier inspection program. All swimming pool barrier fencing must comply with Australian Standard for Swimming Pool Fencing (AS1926). Although some states and territories have particular laws and regulations, there are some stipulations that need to be abided by right across the nation. These include ensuring the pool fencing is 1200 mm high, with a gap of 100 mm or less at the bottom or between the newels. There should be no climbable objects within 900 mm of the pool fencing, and gates should be built so that they swing away from the pool, with a child safety lock.

The gate should be fitted with hinges that are self closing, and are able to do so from a stationary position without any manual force applied. Once closed, the gate should automatically lock and should not be able to be opened again with force unless the latch is manually opened. The gap between the gate panel and the latching panel should be less than 10 mm.

==== Queensland ====
The Queensland state of Australia has very strict laws by world standards. On 1 December 2010 legislation was implemented that will see all swimming pool barriers in the state inspected and issued with a compliance certificate by 30 November 2015.

Swimming pools be surrounded by a four-sided compliant barrier (using the home as one side of the barrier was outlawed) with a minimum height of 1200 mm (48 inches) from permanent ground level and have non-climbable zones of 900 mm (36 inches) in a 180 degree arc measured from the top of the barrier. For non-climbable zones to be compliant there must not be any objects that are more than 10 mm (0.5 inch) in depth and width in the non-climbable zone. Gates are to be self-closing, self latching and not able to be sprung open when a 25 kg (55 pound) downward force is applied to the bottom of the gate.

All swimming pools in Queensland are required to be registered with the Pool Safety Council. All properties leased or sold must have a swimming pool compliance certificate. Short term accommodation providers and shared swimming pools must be inspected every two years. Licensed private swimming pool inspectors inspect swimming pool barriers and issue pool safety compliance certificates.

In 2013 there were 326,000 registered swimming pools in Queensland and 796 active private inspectors.

==== New South Wales ====
New South Wales is the only Australian state or territory to require that infinity or drop edge pools have fencing greater than the standard 1200 mm height requirement. Changes to the NSW legislation state that from 29 April 2016, NSW residential properties with a swimming pool or spa pool must have a certificate of compliance, a certificate of non-compliance or an occupation certificate for the pool barrier/fencing before the property can be leased or sold.

=== United States ===
There is no federal pool fence law currently in place within the United States. However, several states, including Florida and Arizona, have created their own individual pool fence laws. In 2017, the National Safety Council released a report ranking state laws on public pool and water facility regulations as well as four-sided residential pool fencing.

The Association of Pool & Spa Professionals has developed a model barrier code for residential swimming pools, spas, and hot tubs; this code has been approved by the American National Standards Institute.

The International Code Council (I.C.C.), more often known by their former name, the Building Officials and Code Administrators (B.O.C.A.), outlined strong safety standards for swimming pool fences. In an effort to eliminate or reduce the accidental drowning of children, these standards have been recognized by many communities throughout the world. Certain states are more strict with their laws and the most populated states with Pools such as Arizona, California, Florida, and Texas have special statutes in place that discuss all pool fencing types including frameless glass railings. Above ground pools must also follow state and local pool codes if the water is at least 18 inches deep.

In 2006, 283 children under the age of five drowned in swimming pools in the United States.

The I.C.C. pool safety standards specify that:

1. The fence must be a minimum of 48" tall (or taller, depending on distance between horizontal rails).
2. The middle horizontal rail must be at least 45" above the bottom horizontal rail (to prevent using the horizontal rails as a kind of ladder for climbing).
3. The spacing between pickets must be less than 4".
4. If space between pickets is less than 1 3/4'', rule #2 does not apply and fence does not have to be taller than 48'' (because the tighter picket spacing has made climbing much more difficult).
5. The space between the bottom horizontal rail and the ground must be less than 2".
6. The gate(s) must be self-closing and self-latching.
7. The gate(s) need to open out (away from the pool area).
8. The opening mechanism of the latch must be at least 54" above grade (ground level).

=== Europe ===
France was the first European country to introduce swimming pool barrier compliance regulations, applying from 1 May 2004. Failure to comply can result in a €45,000 fine. Spain publicly reported that they would soon follow suit.

=== Other countries ===
Canada, the United Kingdom, Australia, New Zealand and South Africa also have swimming pool fencing laws.

== In popular culture ==
Season 11 of Curb Your Enthusiasm prominently features Larry David's attempt to have a pool fence regulation repealed. After a burglar drowns in Larry's pool, the police inform Larry he must have a five-foot (1.5 m) fence around his pool due to a Santa Monica, California, regulation. The burglar's brother attempts to extort Larry, who responds by beginning a relationship with an unpleasant and unattractive city councilwoman in order to persuade her to repeal the law. In reality, Santa Monica has no such pool fence regulation.

== See also ==
- Child safety lock
- Childproofing
- Drowning
- Attractive nuisance
