= Synthetic fence =

Enclosure made using synthetic plastics

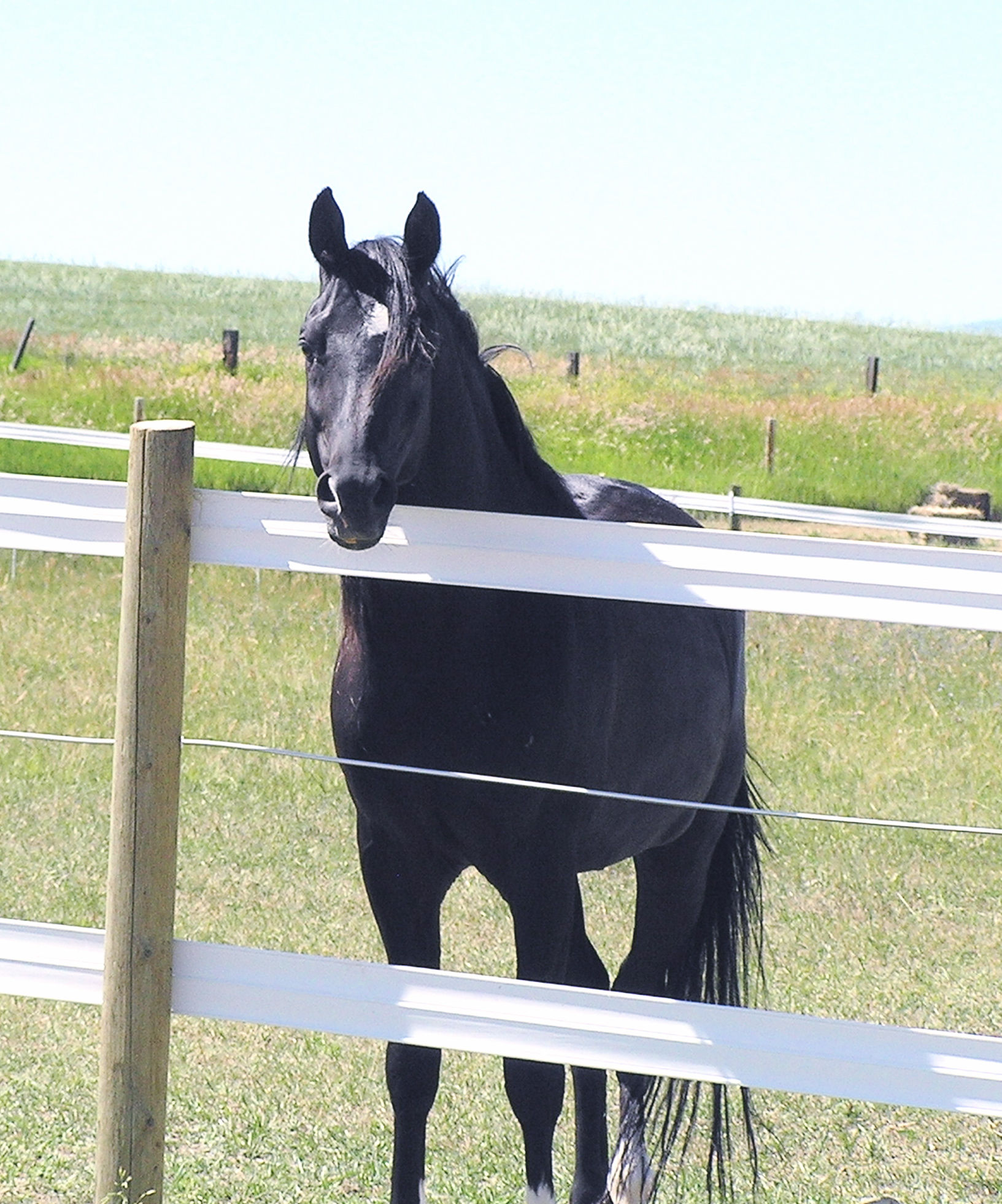
A horse behind a vinyl fence of flexible "rail" and coated wire

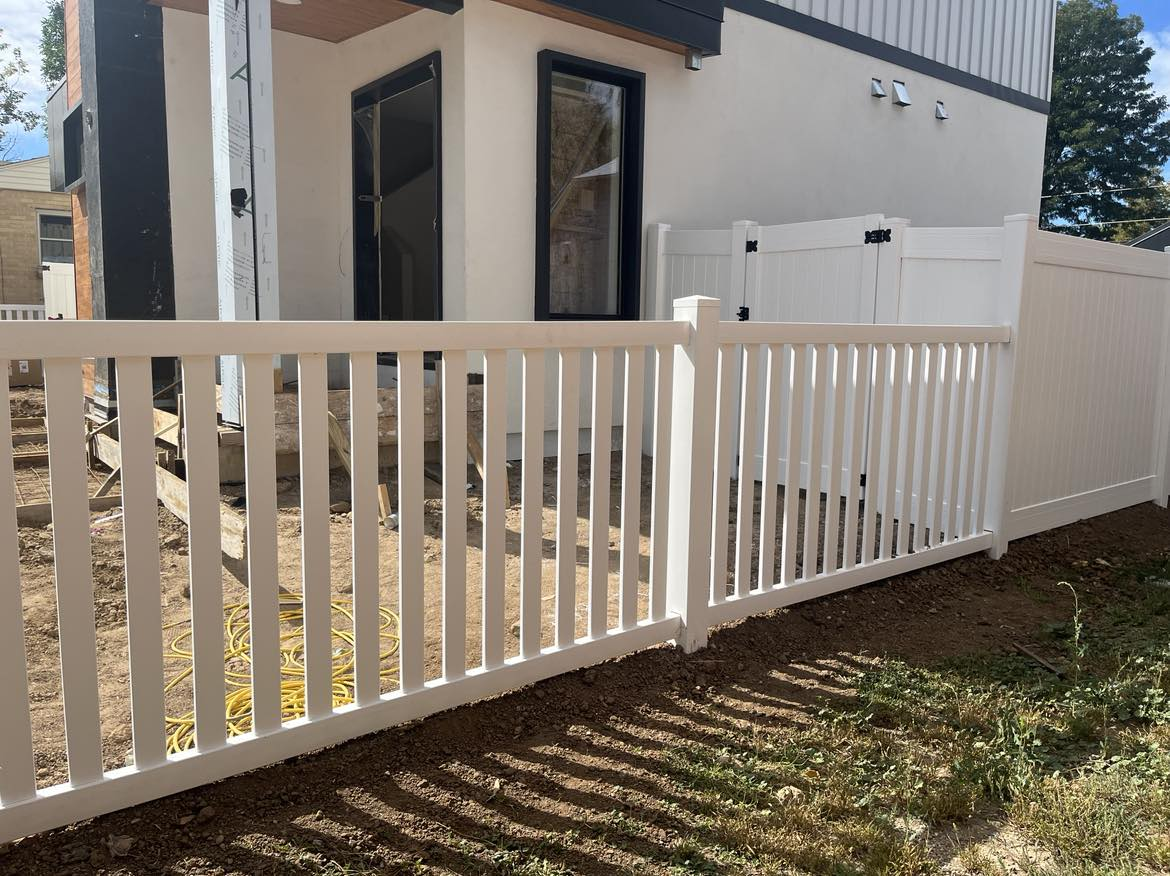
Vinyl Fencing.

A synthetic fence, plastic fence or (when made of vinyl) vinyl or PVC fence is a fence made using synthetic plastics, such as vinyl (PVC), polypropylene, nylon, polythene (polyethylene) ASA, or from various recycled plastics. Composites of two or more plastics can also be used to increase strength and UV stability of a fence. Synthetic fencing was first introduced to the agricultural industry in the 1980s as low-cost, durable horse fencing. Now, synthetic fencing is used for agricultural fencing, horse race track running rail, and residential use. Synthetic fencing is generally available preformed, in a wide variety of styles. It tends to be easy to clean, resists weathering and has low maintenance requirements. However, it also can be more expensive than comparable materials. Some synthetic fence may become brittle, faded or degraded in quality after long exposure to extreme hot or cold conditions. Recently, titanium dioxide (TiO_{2}) and other UV stabilisers have proven to be a beneficial additives in the manufacturing process of vinyl. This has greatly improved the durability of vinyl by providing essential UV protection from the sun's harmful rays, preventing premature ageing and cracking of the product, making it more durable than other materials such as wood.

Synthetic materials used for residential fences can be in a solid cast form, or a reinforced hollow rail design that resembles sawn timber, Most commonly extruded profiles. Higher quality vinyl fence components are ribbed or include reinforcements, often of aluminium, for added strength. For agricultural use, synthetic fencing can consist of a heavy synthetic strapping product inlaid with cable, synthetic-coated high-tensile wire, or a synthetic coating over a wood or metal rail or plank. Residential synthetic fencing products are usually hollow, and thus too fragile to contain livestock, but some designs may be suitable for containing dogs or other pets. Residential grade rails are also made of a thinner material.

Synthetic fences are used as the side-rails along horse racecourses, because they make a good visual barrier for the horses, but are unlikely to cause injury if horses break through them.

Synthetic fence profiles are made in a wide range of sizes and shapes. They come in many different colors which are integrated during the extrusion process, which means they do not require painting. Usually this ability to resist discoloration leads many manufacturers to offer very long warranties, from decades up to "lifetime" for some brands.

Synthetic fence posts are placed into pre-dug holes, or sometimes the synthetic post is fitted over a pre-set post of wood, rebar, or pipe for additional sturdiness. Rails or pickets are inserted into specifically designed slots and grooves within the rails.

Synthetic fence materials are often sold in the form of rigid rails or posts, but flexible forms are also used, including mesh for hazard fencing or deer fencing, or string, rope or tape of polypropylene interwoven with stainless steel wires for electric fences ("electric braid").

== See also ==
- Crowd control barrier

== Sources ==
- Homeowner, Creative (2008), "ch 6. Vinyl fences", Ultimate Guide to Fences, Arbors & Trellises, Creative Homeowner, ISBN 978-1-58011-390-8
