= Thavakkara =

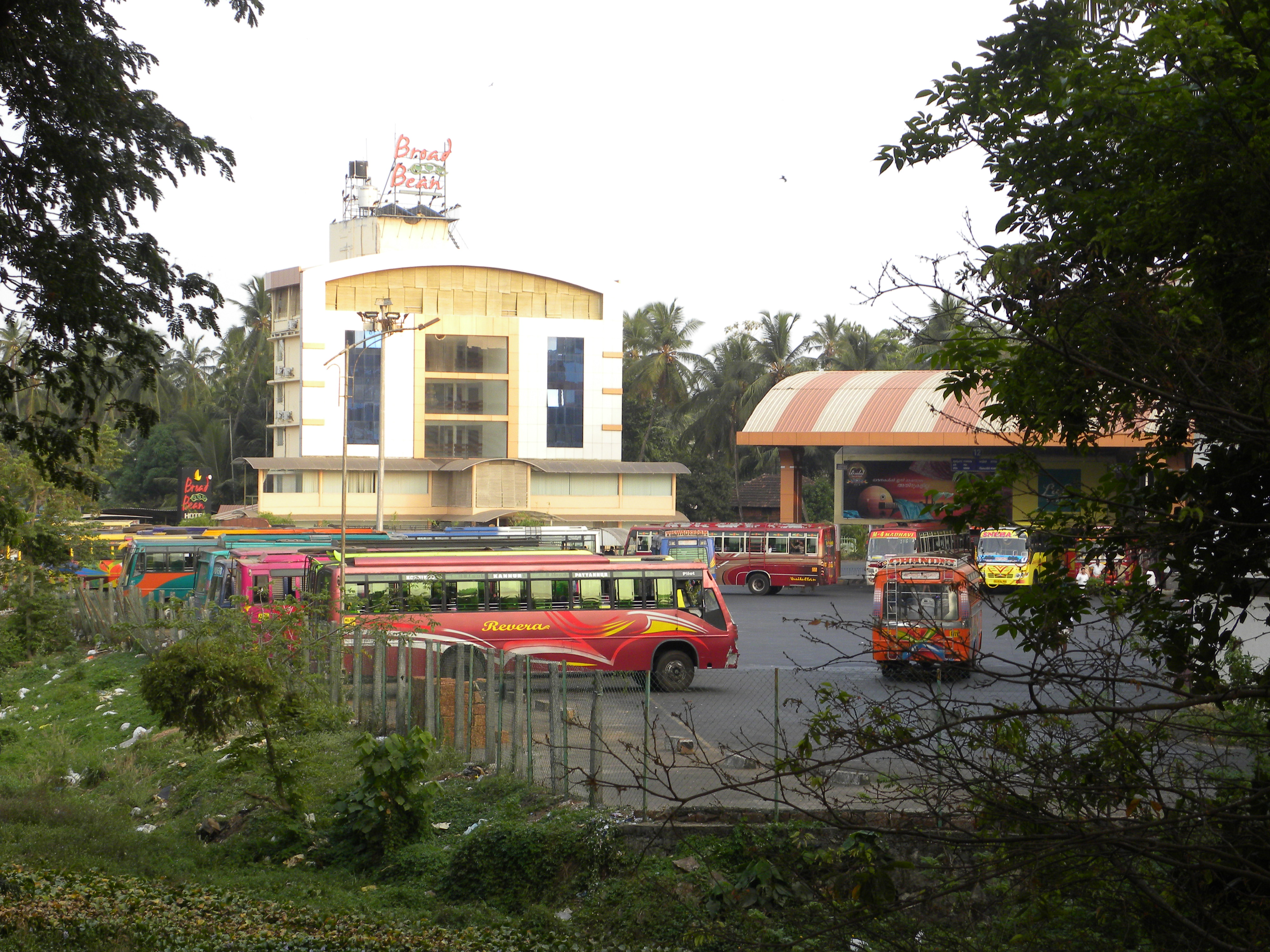
Thavakkara Bus Station, Kannur

Thavakkara is a small area located in the heart of Kannur City of Kerala, India. It is located near to Central Railway Station in Kannur. Kannur's Main Municipal Bus Terminal is in Thavakkara.
