= Temporary fencing =

Temporary enclosure of a place

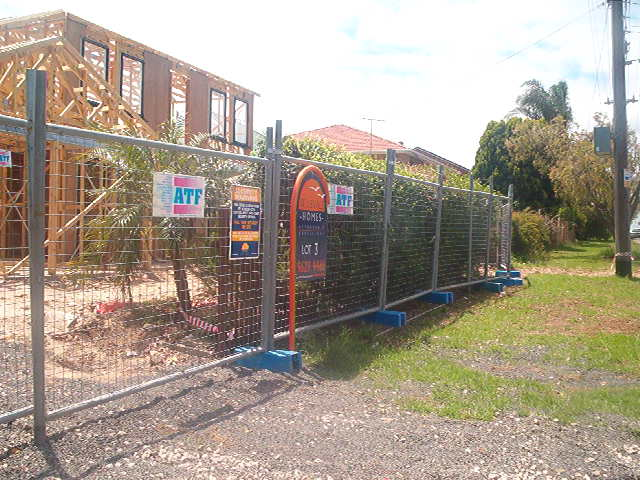
Temporary fencing on a building site in Sydney, Australia.

Temporary fencing is a free-standing, self-supporting fence panel system. The panels are held together with couplers that interlock panels together, making it portable and flexible for a wide range of applications. Fence panels are supported with counter-weighted feet and have a wide variety of accessories including gates, handrails, feet and bracing depending on the application. Fence panels are commonly constructed of either chain link or weld mesh.

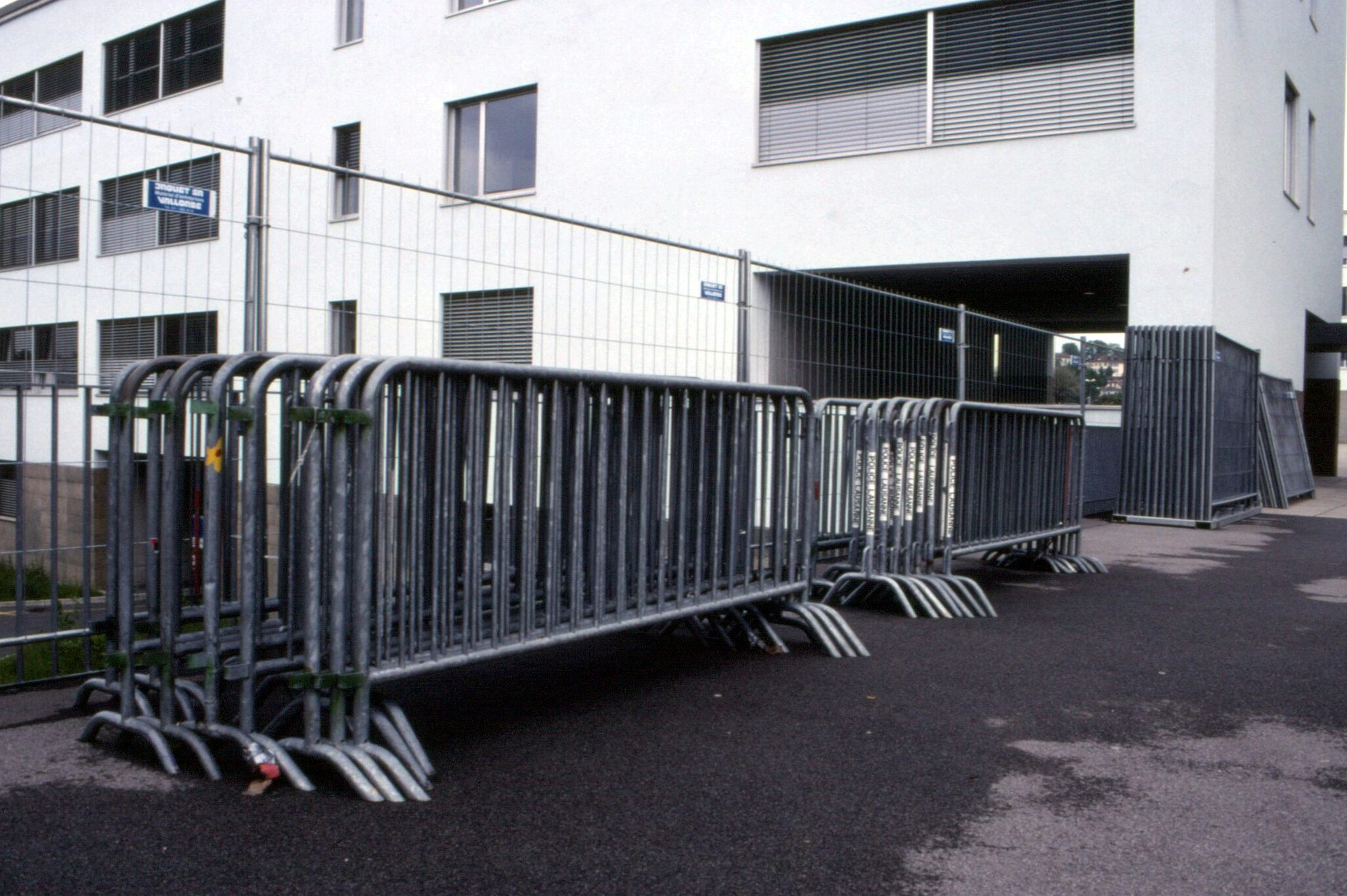
Temporary fencing in storage on a site in Switzerland.

== Applications ==
Temporary fencing is an alternative to its permanent counterpart when a fence is required on an interim basis for storage, public safety or security, crowd control, or theft deterrence. It is also known as construction hoarding when used at construction sites. Other uses for temporary fencing include venue division at large events and public restriction on industrial construction sites, where guardrails are often used.

Temporary fencing is also commonly seen at special outdoor events, parking lots, and emergency/disaster relief sites. It offers the benefits of affordability and flexibility.

Common forms of temporary fencing include a variety of plastic fencing or panels constructed of chainlink, steel or wire. Fencing commonly consists of individual panels that can be set up around the perimeter of the desired area to be fenced in.

Plastic temporary fencing has been used during English cricket games since 2001 as a form of crowd control.

=== Crowd control barrier ===
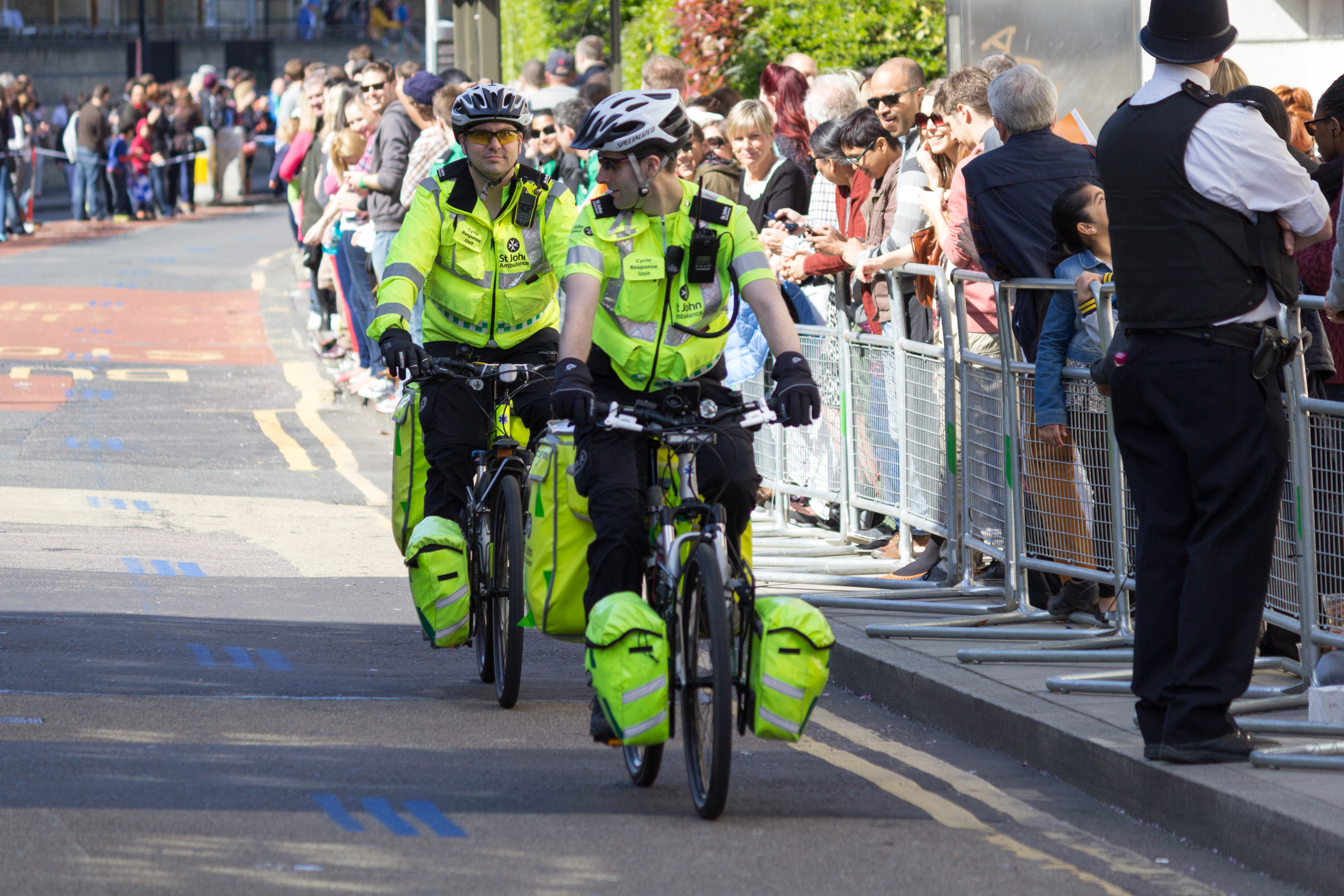
During the 2014 London Marathon, a police officer keeps spectators behind the barrier

Crowd control barriers (also referred to as crowd control barricades, with some versions called a French barrier or bike rack in the United States, and mills barriers in Hong Kong) are commonly used at many public events. They are frequently visible at sporting events, parades, political rallies, demonstrations, and outdoor festivals. Event organizers, venue managers, and security personnel use barricades as part of their crowd management planning.

Brussels mayor Jules Anspach has been credited with the invention of the crowd control barrier for the occasion of the visit of the French photographer Nadar to Brussels. On his visit to Brussels with the balloon Géant, on September 26, 1864, Anspach erected mobile barriers to keep the crowd at a safe distance. Up to this day, crowd control barriers are known in both Belgian Dutch and Belgian French as Nadar barriers.

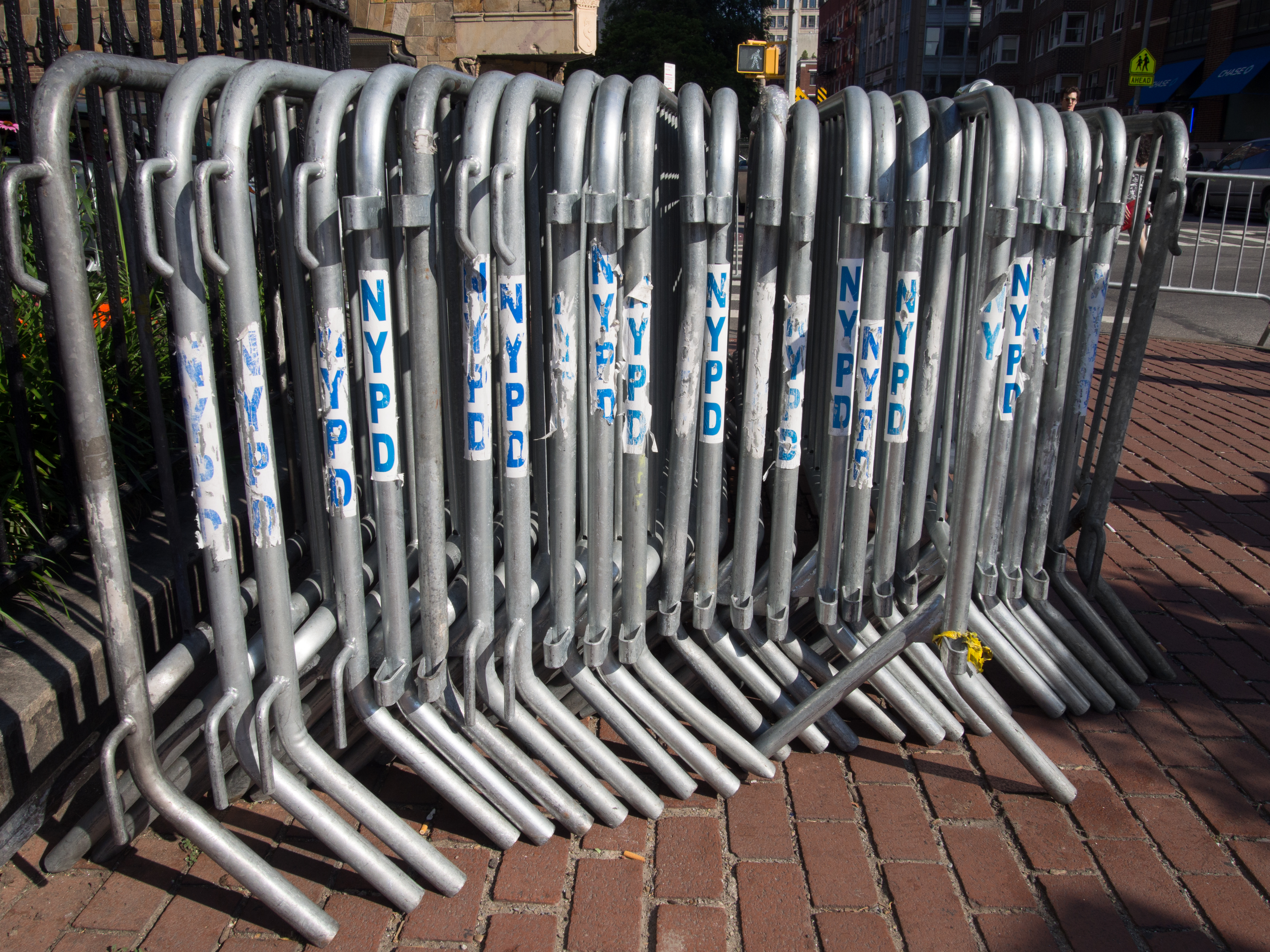
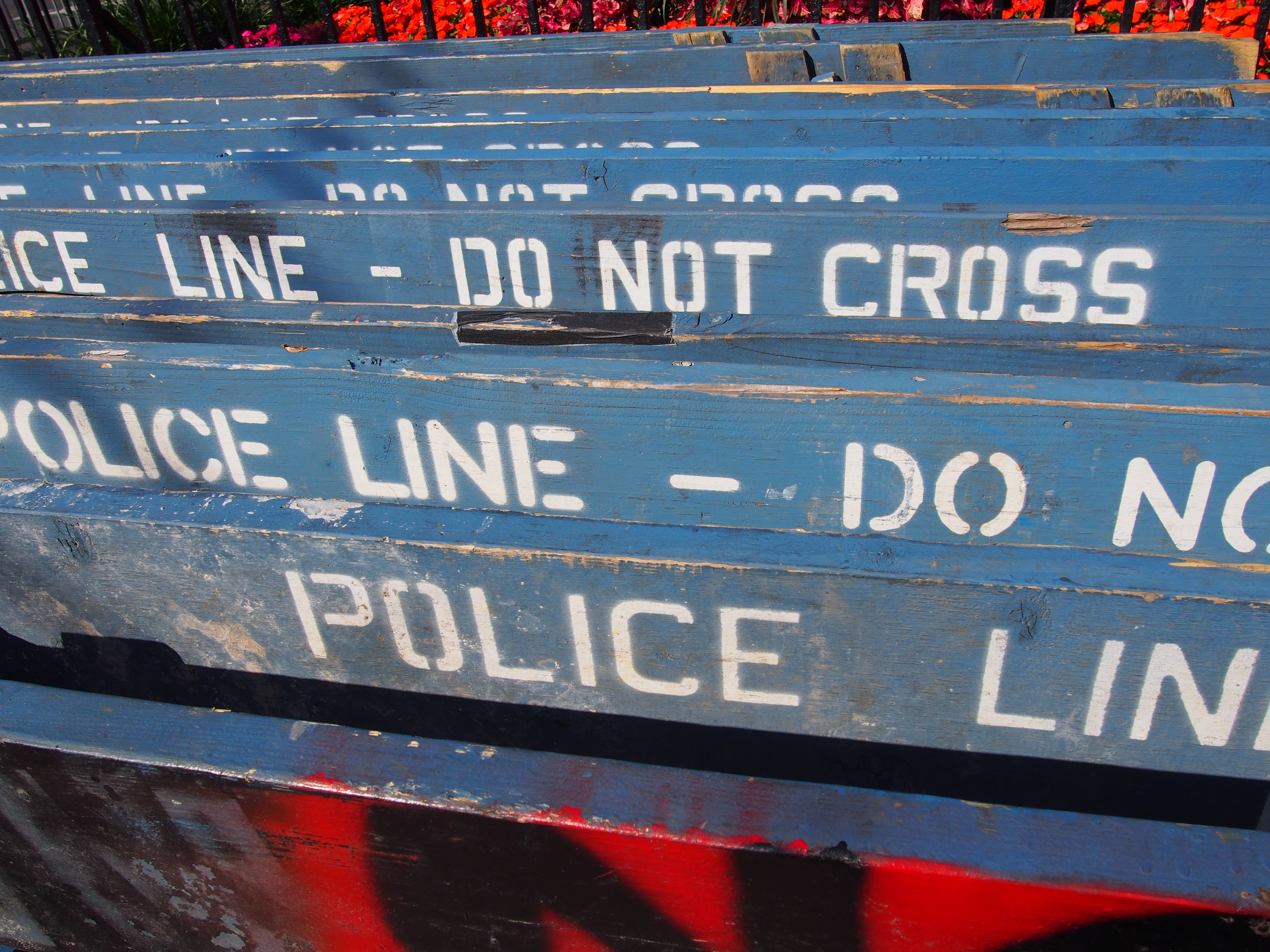
Metal and wooden barriers used by the New York City Police Department at the same location in Manhattan.

Interlocking steel barriers were patented in France in 1951.

== Compliance and enforcement ==
=== Australia ===
In Australia, temporary fencing must comply with the standard AS 4687.1:2022, which specifies requirements for design, fence stability, wind resistance, anti-climb mesh, and proper fitting of panels and clamps/brackets to prevent unauthorised access. The standard was updated in 2022 to introduce risk-based classification levels and stricter wind load requirements.

Under the Work Health and Safety (WHS) Acts in each Australian state, construction site managers must secure their work site "as far as reasonably practicable." This includes ensuring that fence clamps and wind braces are installed properly, maintained, and able to withstand loads such as wind and impacts.

WorkSafe inspectors regularly check worksites for compliance. Insecure or non-complying temporary fencing—such as missing clamps or unstable installations—can attract significant fines. Penalties range from tens of thousands of dollars to more than $2 million in cases where there is risk of injury or death. Other consequences can include enforced site shutdowns and legal liability for injuries or trespassing.

Insurance companies in various countries now include clauses in their policies where if a temporary fence has not been maintained in a secure manner, it can void insurance claims where sites have been burgled or vandalised. This adds another layer of importance for companies to ensure their temporary fences are secure and properly maintained.

=== United States ===
In the United States, the Occupational Safety and Health Administration (OSHA) outlines requirements for construction site access control under 29 CFR 1926. Construction zones must be adequately secured to limit unauthorized access and protect both the public and those working inside the site.

=== United Kingdom ===
In the United Kingdom, the Construction (Design and Management) Regulations 2015 (CDM 2015) is the primary legislation governing health and safety management at construction sites. Temporary fencing is an essential aspect of site security and safety, as it helps protect workers, visitors, and the public from potential hazards.

== Innovations in temporary fencing ==
New developments in temporary fencing have focused on sustainability, increased security, and speed and ease of installation. Some systems now have panels and blocks (feet) made from recycled materials. Some other innovations are tool-free, clamp-free, interlocking panel designs that allow for faster setup time and improved security by reducing the risk of panels being removed by unauthorised people. An example is the No Thru interlocking temporary fencing system.

== See also ==
- Category:Fences
- Chicane (barrier)
- Crowd control
- Crowd manipulation
- Jersey barrier
- Privacy fencing
- Vinyl fence
