= Salida Capital =

Former Canadian hedge fund and private equity firm

Salida Capital LP
- Industry: Financial services
- Fate: closed its funds in 2013
- Headquarters: Toronto, Ontario, Canada
- Key people: CEO Courtenay Wolfe; others: Brad White, Danny Guy, David Fleck
- Website: www.salidacapital.com

Salida Capital was a Canadian hedge fund, private equity and private wealth management firm, based in Toronto, Ontario, and founded in 2001. Salida's assets under management peaked in early 2008 at CAD $1.3 billion and then declined to approximately $300 million following the 2008 financial crisis. The firm struggled for several years before deciding to wind down the two remaining funds in 2013, and deregistering with the Ontario Securities Commission in September 2013.

The company paid US$1.68 million in 2009 for some of its executives to dine with Warren Buffett, CEO of Berkshire Hathaway. In April 2010, the company announced plans to launch a private equity fund, which at the time had C$100 million in seed investment committed so far. Like many financial portfolios during the 2008 financial crisis, Salida's hedge fund declined in value—it fell 66.5% in 2008—but it recovered a portion the following year by rising 83% (around 40% of its lost value). The firm subsequently suffered further losses, with the Salida Strategic Growth Fund losing a large portion of its capital before deciding to terminate the fund.
