= Venture capital =

Form of private-equity financing

Venture capital (VC) is a form of private equity financing provided by firms or funds to startup, early-stage, and emerging companies, that have been deemed to have high growth potential or that have demonstrated high growth in terms of number of employees, annual revenue, scale of operations, etc. Venture capital firms or funds invest in these early-stage companies in exchange for equity, or an ownership stake. Venture capitalists take on the risk of financing start-ups in the hopes that some of the companies they support will become successful. Because startups face high uncertainty, VC investments have high rates of failure. Start-ups are usually based on an innovative technology or business model and often come from high technology industries such as information technology (IT) or biotechnology.

Pre-seed and seed rounds are the initial stages of funding for a startup company, typically occurring early in its development. During a seed round, entrepreneurs seek investment from angel investors, venture capital firms, or other sources to finance the initial operations and development of their business idea. Seed funding is often used to validate the concept, build a prototype, or conduct market research. This initial capital injection is crucial for startups to kickstart their journey and attract further investment in subsequent funding rounds.

Typical venture capital investments occur after an initial "seed funding" round. The first round of institutional venture capital to fund growth is called the Series A round. Venture capitalists provide this financing in the interest of generating a return through an eventual "exit" event, such as the company selling shares to the public for the first time in an initial public offering (IPO), or disposal of shares happening via a merger, via a sale to another entity such as a financial buyer in the private equity secondary market or via a sale to a trading company such as a competitor.

In addition to angel investing, equity crowdfunding and other seed funding options, venture capital is attractive for new companies with limited operating history that are too small to raise capital in the public markets and have not reached the point where they are able to secure a bank loan or complete a debt offering. In exchange for the high risk that venture capitalists assume by investing in smaller and early-stage companies, venture capitalists usually get significant control over company decisions, in addition to a significant portion of the companies' ownership (and consequently value). Privately owned companies who have reached a market valuation of over $1 billion are referred to as unicorns. As of May 2024, there were a reported total of 1248 unicorn companies. Venture capitalists also often provide strategic advice to the company's executives on its business model and marketing strategies.

== History and growth ==
Modern venture capital first emerged in the post-World War II era. The American Research and Development Corporation (ARDC) was established in 1946 by Georges Doriot, who is regarded as the "father of venture capitalism," Karl Compton, and Ralph Flanders. As the first institutional private equity firm to combine funds from non-family sources, ARDC was a trailblazer that made it possible for corporate and institutional investors to support early-stage startups.

Technological advancements, especially in the field of artificial intelligence, caused the industry to grow significantly. By 2025, a significant portion of venture capital funding worldwide went to artificial intelligence companies. AI startups accounted for 61% of all venture capital investments made worldwide in 2025, totaling $258.7 billion out of $427.1 billion, according to an OECD analysis. Traditional venture deal sourcing has been altered by this structural change, which has led companies to use live data tools to compile hiring trends and product traffic prior to regular seed rounds.

== Financing ==
Obtaining venture capital is substantially different from raising debt or a loan. Lenders have a legal right to interest on a loan and repayment of the capital irrespective of the success or failure of a business. Venture capital is invested in exchange for an equity stake in the business. The return of the venture capitalist as a shareholder depends on the growth and profitability of the business. This return is generally earned when the venture capitalist "exits" by selling its shareholdings when the business is sold to another owner.

Venture capitalists are typically very selective in deciding what to invest in, with a Stanford survey of venture capitalists revealing that 100 companies were considered for every company receiving financing. Ventures receiving financing must demonstrate an excellent management team, a large potential market, and most importantly high growth potential, as only such opportunities are likely capable of providing financial returns and a successful exit within the required time frame (typically 8–12 years) that venture capitalists expect.

Because investments are illiquid and require the extended time frame to harvest, venture capitalists are expected to carry out detailed due diligence prior to investment. Venture capitalists also are expected to nurture the companies in which they invest, in order to increase the likelihood of reaching an IPO stage when valuations are favourable. Venture capitalists typically assist at four stages in the company's development:

- Idea generation;
- Start-up;
- Ramp-up; and
- Exit

Because there are no public exchanges listing their securities, private companies meet venture capital firms and other private-equity investors in several ways, including warm referrals from the investors' trusted sources and other business contacts; investor conferences and symposia; and summits where companies pitch directly to investor groups in face-to-face meetings, including a variant known as "Speed Venturing", which is akin to speed-dating for capital, where the investor decides within 10 minutes whether he wants a follow-up meeting. In addition, some new private online networks are emerging to provide additional opportunities for meeting investors.

This need for high returns makes venture funding an expensive capital source for companies, and most suitable for businesses having large up-front capital requirements, which cannot be financed by cheaper alternatives such as debt. That is most commonly the case for intangible assets such as software, and other intellectual property, whose value is unproven. In turn, this explains why venture capital is most prevalent in the fast-growing technology and life sciences or biotechnology fields.

If a company does have the qualities venture capitalists seek including a substantial business plan, a good management team, investment and passion from the founders, a potential to exit the investment before the end of their funding cycle, and target minimum returns in excess of 40% per year, it will find it easier to raise venture capital.

=== Financing stages ===
There are multiple stages of venture financing offered in venture capital, that roughly correspond to these stages of a company's development.

- Pre-seed funding: The earliest round of financing needed to prove a new idea, often provided by friends and family, angel investors, startup accelerators, and sometimes by venture capital funds. Equity crowdfunding is also emerging as an option for seed funding.
- Early Stage: Early stage funding includes Seed and Series A financing rounds. Companies use this capital to find product-market fit.
- Growth Capital: Once companies have found product-market fit, companies will use growth capital to scale the business. These are typically larger financing rounds with have higher valuations because the companies have started to prove traction and de-risk the investment. Growth capital typically includes Series B, Series C, and later rounds.
- Exit of venture capitalist: VCs can exit through secondary sale or an initial public offering (IPO) or an acquisition. Early stage VCs may exit in later rounds when new investors (VCs or private-equity investors) buy the shares of existing investors. Sometimes a company very close to an IPO may allow some VCs to exit and instead new investors may come in hoping to profit from the IPO.
- Bridge financing is when a startup seeks funding in between full VC rounds. The objective is to raise a smaller amount of money to "bridge" the gap when current funds are expected to run out prior to planned future funding, intended to meet short-term working capital needs.

In early stage and growth stage financings, venture-backed companies may also seek to take venture debt.

== Firms and funds ==
=== Venture capitalist ===
A venture capitalist, or sometimes simply called a capitalist, is a person who makes capital investments in companies in exchange for an equity stake. The venture capitalist is often expected to bring managerial and technical expertise, as well as capital, to their investments. A venture capital fund refers to a pooled investment vehicle (in the United States, often an LP or LLC) that primarily invests the financial capital of third-party investors in enterprises that are too risky for the standard capital markets or bank loans. These funds are typically managed by a venture capital firm, which often employs individuals with technology backgrounds (scientists, researchers), business training and/or deep industry experience.

A core skill within VCs is the ability to identify novel or disruptive technologies that have the potential to generate high commercial returns at an early stage. By definition, VCs also take a role in managing entrepreneurial companies at an early stage, thus adding skills as well as capital, thereby differentiating VC from buy-out private equity, which typically invest in companies with proven revenue, and thereby potentially realizing much higher rates of returns. Inherent in realizing abnormally high rates of returns is the risk of losing all of one's investment in a given startup company. As a consequence, most venture capital investments are done in a pool format, where several investors combine their investments into one large fund that invests in many different startup companies. By investing in the pool format, the investors are spreading out their risk to many different investments instead of taking the chance of putting all of their money in one start up firm.

=== Structure ===
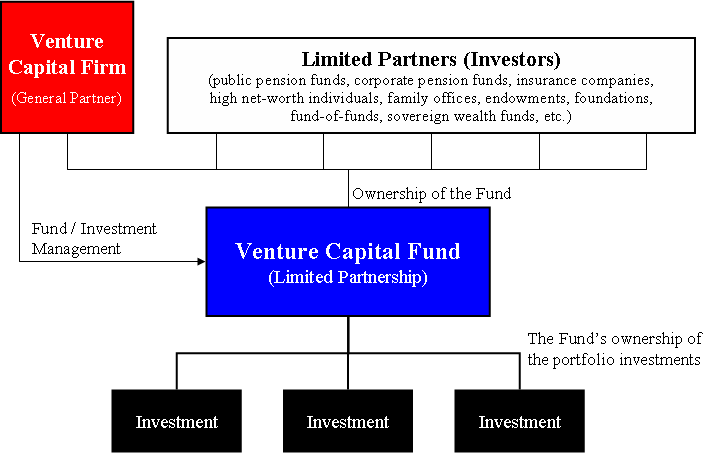
Structure of a generic venture capital fund

Venture capital firms are typically structured as partnerships, the general partners of which serve as the managers of the firm and will serve as investment advisors to the venture capital funds raised. Venture capital firms in the United States may also be structured as limited liability companies, in which case the firm's managers are known as managing members. Investors in venture capital funds are known as limited partners. This constituency comprises both high-net-worth individuals and institutions with large amounts of available capital, such as state and private pension funds, university financial endowments, foundations, insurance companies, and pooled investment vehicles, called funds of funds.

=== Types ===
Venture capitalist firms differ in their motivations and approaches. There are multiple factors, and each firm is different.

Venture capital funds are generally three in types:

1. Angel investors
2. Financial VCs
3. Strategic VCs

Some of the factors that influence VC decisions include:

- Business situation: Some VCs tend to invest in new, disruptive ideas, or fledgling companies. Others prefer investing in established companies that need support to go public or grow.
- Some invest solely in certain industries.
- Some prefer operating locally while others will operate nationwide or even globally.
- VC expectations can often vary. Some may want a quicker public sale of the company or expect fast growth. The amount of help a VC provides can vary from one firm to the next. There are also estimates on how big of an exit a VC will expect for the company (i.e. if the size of the VC fund is $20M, estimate that they will at least want the company to exit for the size of the fund).

=== Roles ===
Within the venture capital industry, the general partners and other investment professionals of the venture capital firm are often referred to as "venture capitalists" or "VCs". Typical career backgrounds vary, but, broadly speaking, venture capitalists come from either an operational or a finance background. Venture capitalists with an operational background (operating partner) tend to be former founders or executives of companies similar to those which the partnership finances or will have served as management consultants. Venture capitalists with finance backgrounds tend to have investment banking or other corporate finance experience.

Although the titles are not entirely uniform from firm to firm, other positions at venture capital firms include:

Position	Role
General Partners or GPs	They run the Venture Capital firm and make the investment decisions on behalf of the fund. GPs typically put in personal capital up to 1–2% of the VC Fund size to show their commitment to the LPs.
Venture partners	Venture partners are not employees of the firm but are expected to source potential investment opportunities ("bring in deals") and typically are compensated only for those deals with which they are involved.
Principal	This is a mid-level investment professional position, and often considered a "partner-track" position. Principals will have been promoted from a senior associate position or who have commensurate experience in another field, such as investment banking, management consulting, or a market of particular interest to the strategy of the venture capital firm.
Associate	This is typically the most junior apprentice position within a venture capital firm. After a few successful years, an associate may move up to the "senior associate" position and potentially principal and beyond. Associates will often have worked for 1–2 years in another field, such as investment banking or management consulting.
Analyst	In some cases, a venture capital firm may offer an analyst role for fresh graduates who have no prior relevant experience.
Entrepreneur-in-residence	Entrepreneurs-in-residence (EIRs) are experts in a particular industry sector (e.g., biotechnology or social media) and perform due diligence on potential deals. EIRs are hired by venture capital firms temporarily (6 to 18 months) and are expected to develop and pitch startup ideas to their host firm, although neither party is bound to work with each other. Some EIRs move on to executive positions within a portfolio company.
Platform Team	Responsible for providing support and resources to portfolio companies beyond financial investment. This team focuses on offering strategic guidance, operational expertise, and access to networks to help portfolio companies scale and succeed. Platform teams may assist with talent acquisition, marketing and branding, product development, business networking, and strategic partnerships.

=== Structure of the funds ===
The average maturity of most venture capital funds ranges from 10 years to 12 years, with the possibility of a few years of extensions to allow for private companies still seeking liquidity. The investing cycle for most funds is generally three to five years, after which the focus is managing and making follow-on investments in an existing portfolio. This model was pioneered by successful funds in Silicon Valley through the 1980s to invest in technological trends broadly but only during their period of ascendance, and to cut exposure to management and marketing risks of any individual firm or its product.

In such a fund, the investors have a fixed commitment to the fund that is initially unfunded and subsequently "called down" by the venture capital fund over time as the fund makes its investments. There are substantial penalties for a limited partner (or investor) that fails to participate in a capital call.

It can take anywhere from a month to several years for venture capitalists to raise money from limited partners for their fund. At the time when all of the money has been raised, the fund is said to be closed and the 10-year lifetime begins. Some funds have partial closes when one half (or some other amount) of the fund has been raised. The vintage year generally refers to the year in which the fund was closed and may serve as a means to stratify VC funds for comparison.

From an investor's point of view, funds can be: (1) traditional—where all the investors invest with equal terms; or (2) asymmetric—where different investors have different terms. Typically asymmetry is seen in cases where investors have opposing interests, such as the need to not have unrelated business taxable income in the case of public tax-exempt investors.

=== Investment decision process ===
The decision process to fund a company is elusive. One study report in the Harvard Business Review states that VCs rarely use standard financial analytics. First, VCs engage in a process known as "generating deal flow," where they reach out to their network to source potential investments. The study also reported that few VCs use any type of financial analytics when they assess deals; VCs are primarily concerned about the cash returned from the deal as a multiple of the cash invested. According to 95% of the VC firms surveyed, VCs cite the founder or founding team as the most important factor in their investment decision. Other factors are also considered, including intellectual property rights and the state of the economy. Some argue that the most important thing a VC looks for in a company is high-growth.

The funding decision process has spawned bias in the form of a large disparity between the funding received by men and minority groups, such as women and people of color. In 2021, female founders only received 2% of VC funding in the United States. Some research studies have found that VCs evaluate women differently and are less likely to fund female founders.

=== Compensation ===
Venture capitalists are compensated through a combination of management fees and carried interest (often referred to as a "two and 20" arrangement):

Payment	Implementation
Management fees	Quarterly payments made by the limited partners to the fund's manager to pay for the firm's investment operations. In a typical venture capital fund, the general partners receive an annual management fee between 2% and 2.5% of the committed capital.
Carried interest	A share of the profits of the fund, typically 20%, paid to the fund's general partner as a performance incentive. The remaining 80% of the profits are allocated to the general partner and limited partners in proportion to their contributed capital. Strong limited partner interest in top-tier venture firms has led to a general trend toward terms more favorable to the general partner, and certain groups are able to command a carried interest of 25 to 30% for their funds.

Because a fund may run out of capital prior to the end of its life, larger venture capital firms usually have several overlapping funds at the same time; doing so lets the larger firm keep specialists in all stages of the development of firms almost constantly engaged. Smaller firms tend to thrive or fail with their initial industry contacts; by the time the fund cashes out, an entirely new generation of technologies and people is ascending, whom the general partners may not know well, and so it is prudent to reassess and shift industries or personnel rather than attempt to simply invest more in the industry or people the partners already know.

=== Alternatives ===
Because of the strict requirements venture capitalists have for potential investments, many entrepreneurs seek seed funding from angel investors, who may be more willing to invest in highly speculative opportunities, or may have a prior relationship with the entrepreneur.

Additionally, entrepreneurs may seek alternative financing, such as revenue-based financing, to avoid giving up equity ownership in the business. For entrepreneurs seeking more than just funding, startup studios can be an appealing alternative to venture capitalists, as they provide operational support and an experienced team.

A growing number of companies are also turning to venture debt as an alternative, particularly in technology and life sciences sectors, where it provides working capital without significant equity dilution.

Furthermore, many venture capital firms will only seriously evaluate an investment in a start-up company otherwise unknown to them if the company can prove at least some of its claims about the technology and/or market potential for its product or services. To achieve this, or even just to avoid the dilutive effects of receiving funding before such claims are proven, many start-ups seek to self-finance sweat equity until they reach a point where they can credibly approach outside capital providers such as venture capitalists or angel investors. This practice is called "bootstrapping".

Equity crowdfunding is emerging as an alternative to traditional venture capital. Traditional crowdfunding is an approach to raising the capital required for a new project or enterprise by appealing to large numbers of ordinary people for small donations. While such an approach has long precedents in the sphere of charity, it is receiving renewed attention from entrepreneurs, now that social media and online communities make it possible to reach out to a group of potentially interested supporters at very low cost. Some equity crowdfunding models are also being applied specifically for startup funding, such as those listed at Comparison of crowd funding services. One of the reasons to look for alternatives to venture capital is the problem of the traditional VC model. The traditional VCs are shifting their focus to later-stage investments, and return on investment of many VC funds have been low or negative.

In Europe and India, Media for equity is a partial alternative to venture capital funding. Media for equity investors are able to supply start-ups with often significant advertising campaigns in return for equity. In Europe, an investment advisory firm offers young ventures the option to exchange equity for services investment; their aim is to guide ventures through the development stage to arrive at a significant funding, mergers and acquisition, or other exit strategy.

In industries where assets can be securitized effectively because they reliably generate future revenue streams or have a good potential for resale in case of foreclosure, businesses may more cheaply be able to raise debt to finance their growth. Good examples would include asset-intensive extractive industries such as mining, or manufacturing industries. Offshore funding is provided via specialist venture capital trusts, which seek to use securitization in structuring hybrid multi-market transactions via an SPV (special purpose vehicle): a corporate entity that is designed solely for the purpose of the financing.

In addition to traditional venture capital and angel networks, groups have emerged, which allow groups of small investors or entrepreneurs themselves to compete in a privatized business plan competition where the group itself serves as the investor through a democratic process.

Law firms are also increasingly acting as an intermediary between clients seeking venture capital and the firms providing it.

Other forms include venture resources that seek to provide non-monetary support to launch a new venture.

== Role in employment ==
Every year, there are nearly 2 million businesses created in the US, but only 600–800 get venture capital funding. According to the National Venture Capital Association, 11% of private sector jobs come from venture-backed companies and venture-backed revenue accounts for 21% of US GDP.

== Gender disparities ==
In 2020, female-founded companies raised 2.8% of capital investment from venture capital, the highest amount recorded. Babson College's Diana Report found that the number of women partners in VC firms decreased from 10% in 1999 to 6% in 2014. The report also found that 97% of VC-funded businesses had male chief executives, and that businesses with all-male teams were more than four times as likely to receive VC funding compared to teams with at least one woman. However, analysis also shows tiny percentage of companies with women CEOs are receiving venture capital, these businesses are receiving approximately the same level of investment, and are just as likely to receive early- and late-stage funding, as those with men CEOs. Furthermore, there is evidence that they perform just as well as all-male firms once approved.

Currently, about 3% of all venture capital is going to woman-led companies. More than 75% of VC firms in the US did not have any female venture capitalists at the time they were surveyed. It was found that a greater fraction of VC firms had never had a woman represent them on the board of one of their portfolio companies. For comparison, a UC Davis study focusing on large public companies in California found 49.5% with at least one female board seat.

== Geographical differences ==
Venture capital, as an industry, originated in the United States, and American firms have traditionally been the largest participants in venture deals with the bulk of venture capital being deployed in American companies. However, increasingly, non-US venture investment is growing, and the number and size of non-US venture capitalists have been expanding.

Venture capital has been used as a tool for economic development in a variety of developing regions. In many of these regions, with less developed financial sectors, venture capital plays a role in facilitating access to finance for small and medium enterprises (SMEs), which in most cases would not qualify for receiving bank loans.

In the year of 2008, while VC funding was still majorly dominated by U.S. money ($28.8 billion invested in over 2550 deals in 2008), compared to international fund investments ($13.4 billion invested elsewhere), there has been an average 5% growth in the venture capital deals outside the US, mainly in China and Europe. Geographical differences can be significant. For instance, in the UK, 4% of British investment goes to venture capital, compared to about 33% in the U.S.

VC funding has been shown to be positively related to a country's individualistic culture. According to economist Jeffrey Funk, however, more than 90% of US startups valued over $1 billion lost money between 2019–2020 and return on investment from VC barely exceed return from public stock markets over the last 25 years.

=== United States ===
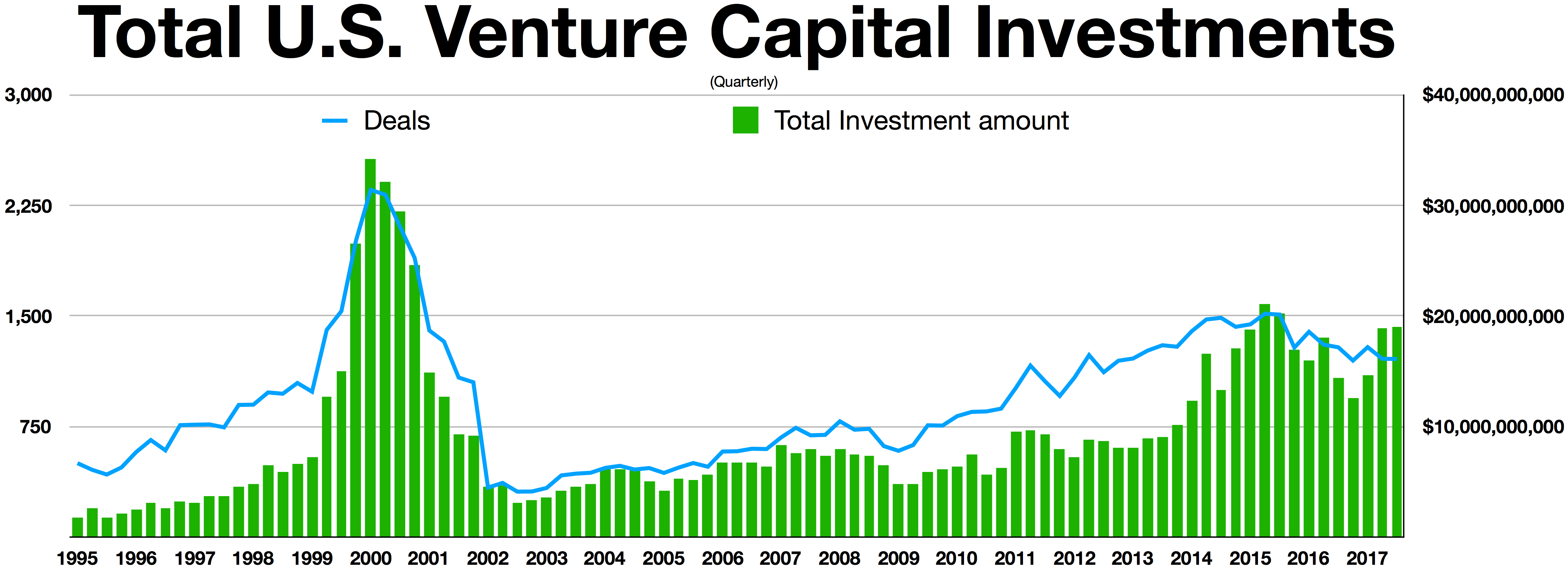
Quarterly U.S. Venture Capital Investments, 1995–2017

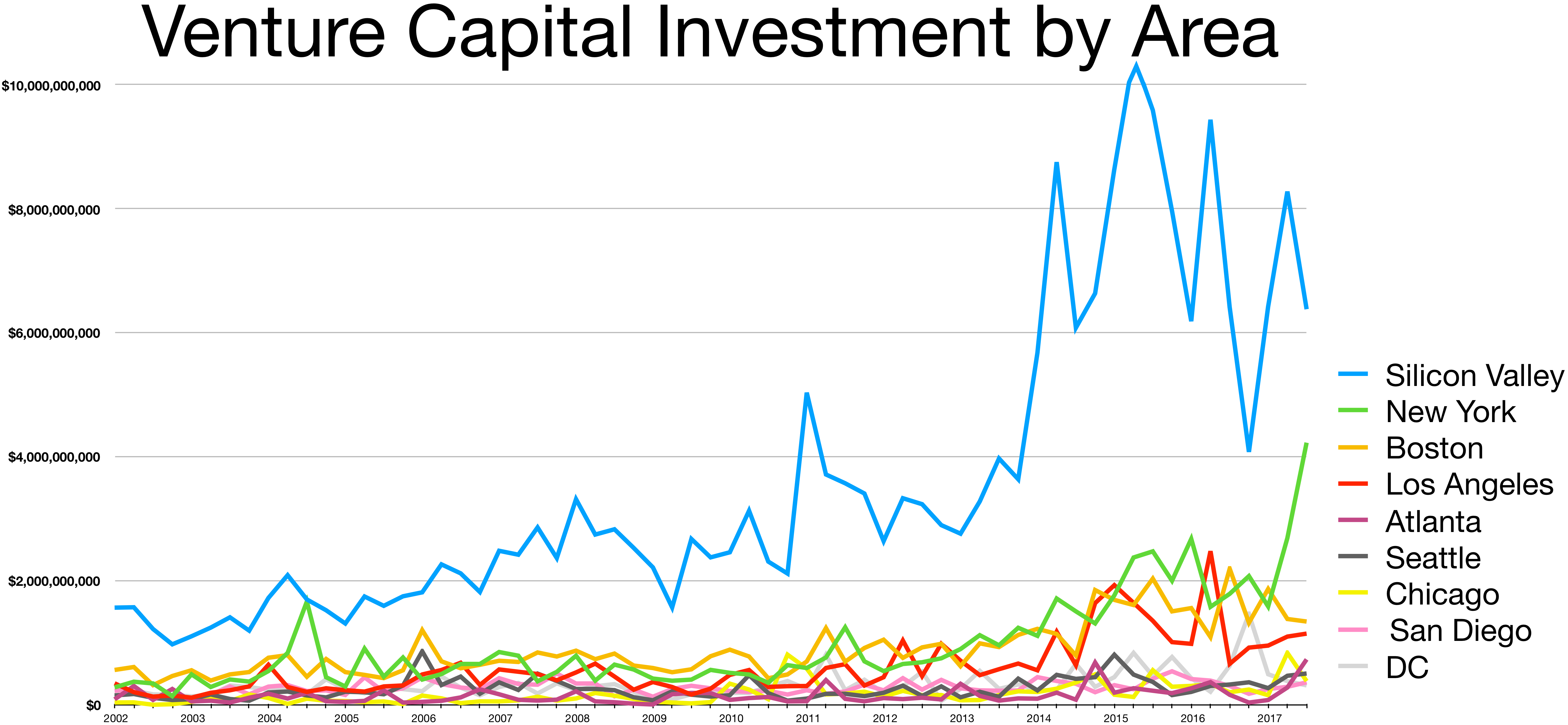
Venture capital investment by area

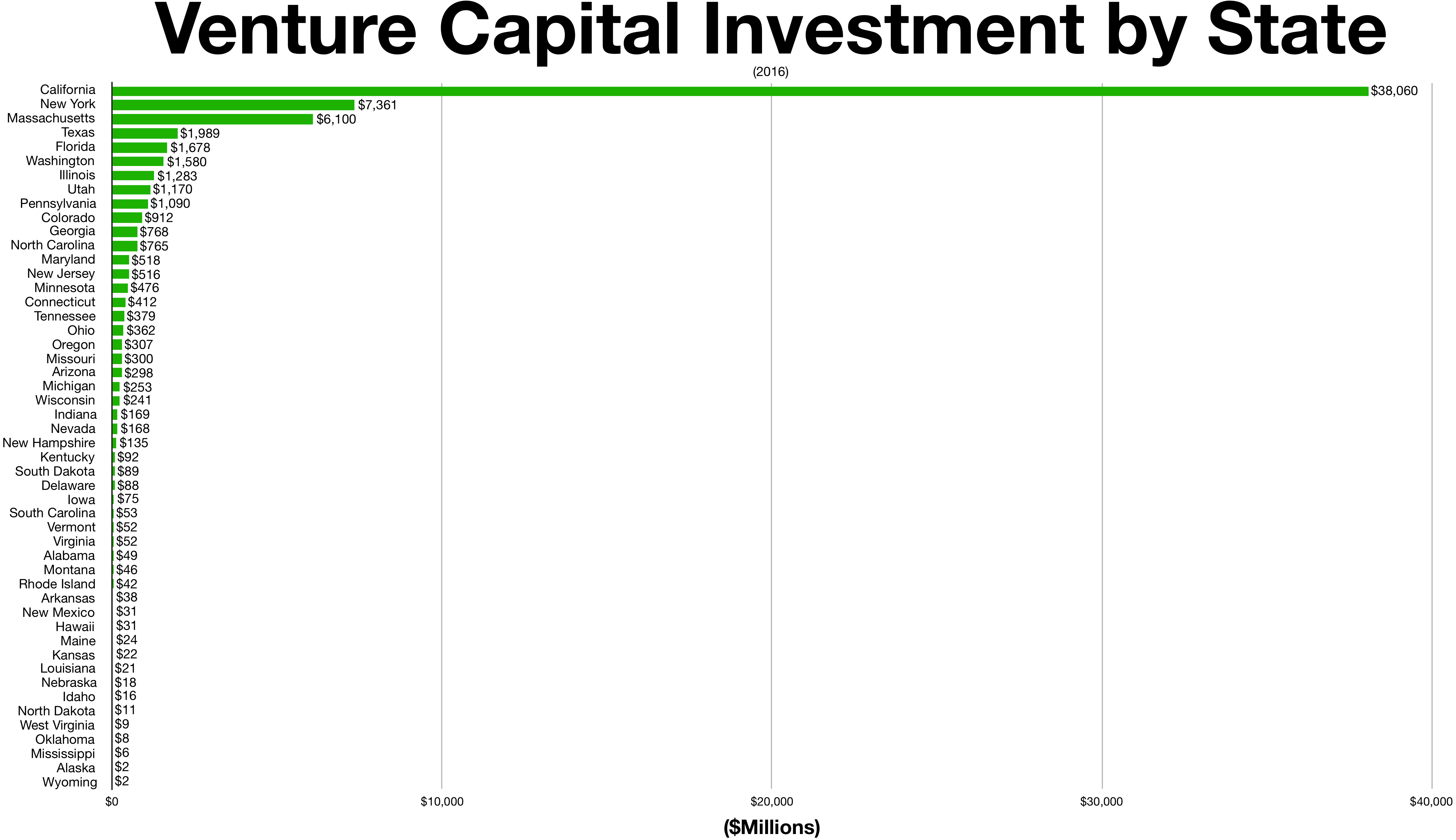
Venture capital by state, 2016

In the United States, venture capital investment reached $321.6 billion in 2025, marking the highest-grossing year on record. Early data from KPMG indicates that 2026 is on pace to set a new record, with the first quarter alone raising $267 billion. This surge is primarily driven by massive investments and soaring valuations in the artificial intelligence (AI) sector.

=== Canada ===
Canadian technology companies have attracted interest from the global venture capital community partially as a result of generous tax incentive through the Scientific Research and Experimental Development (SR&ED) investment tax credit program. The basic incentive available to any Canadian corporation performing R&D is a refundable tax credit that is equal to 20% of "qualifying" R&D expenditures (labour, material, R&D contracts, and R&D equipment). An enhanced 35% refundable tax credit of available to certain (i.e. small) Canadian-controlled private corporations (CCPCs). Because the CCPC rules require a minimum of 50% Canadian ownership in the company performing R&D, foreign investors who would like to benefit from the larger 35% tax credit must accept minority position in the company, which might not be desirable. The SR&ED program does not restrict the export of any technology or intellectual property that may have been developed with the benefit of SR&ED tax incentives.

Canada also has a fairly unusual form of venture capital generation in its labour-sponsored venture capital corporations (LSVCC). These funds, also known as Retail Venture Capital or Labour Sponsored Investment Funds (LSIF), are generally sponsored by labor unions and offer tax breaks from government to encourage retail investors to purchase the funds. Generally, these Retail Venture Capital funds only invest in companies where the majority of employees are in Canada. However, innovative structures have been developed to permit LSVCCs to direct in Canadian subsidiaries of corporations incorporated in jurisdictions outside of Canada. In 2022, the Information and Communications Technology (ICT) sector closed around 50% of Canada's venture capital deals, 16% were in the Life Sciences.

=== Australia and New Zealand ===
In Australia and New Zealand, there have been 3 waves of VC, starting with Bill Ferris who founded IVC in 1970. are more than one hundred active VC funds, syndicates, or angel investors making VC-style investments. The 2nd wave was led by Starfish & Southern Cross VC, with the latter producing the leading VC of the 3rd wave, Blackbird. There was a boom in 2018, and today there are more than one hundred active VC funds, syndicates, or angel investors making VC-style investments. There have been few Nasdaq IPOs of Australian VC backed startups, with only Looksmart from Bill Ferris's fund, and Quantenna from Larry Marshall's Southern Cross VC, but Blackbird is expected to IPO Canva soon.

The State of Startup Funding report found that in 2021, over AUD $10 billion AUD was invested into Australian and New Zealand startups across 682 deals. This represents a 3x increase from the $3.1 billion that was invested in 2020.

Some notable Australian and New Zealand startup success stories include graphic design company Canva, financial services provider Airwallex, New Zealand payments provider Vend (acquired by Lightspeed), rent-to-buy company OwnHome, and direct-to-consumer propositions such as Eucalyptus (a house of direct-to-consumer telehealth brands), and Lyka (a pet wellness company). BugHerd, the developer of a website feedback and bug tracking software application joined the Startmate accelerator in 2011 and raised a $1.5 million between 2012 and 2014, mostly from Tankstream Ventures and Starfish Ventures.

In 2022, the largest Australian funds are Blackbird Ventures, Square Peg Capital, and Airtree Ventures. These three funds have more than $1 billion AUD under management across multiple funds. These funds have funding from institutional capital, including AustralianSuper and Hostplus, family offices, and sophisticated individual high-net-wealth investors.

Outside of the "Big 3", other notable institutional funds include AfterWork Ventures, Artesian, Folklore Ventures, Equity Venture Partners, Our Innovation Fund, Investible, Main Sequence Ventures (the VC arm of the CSIRO), OneVentures, Proto Axiom, and Tenacious Ventures.

As the number of capital providers in the Australian and New Zealand ecosystem has grown, funds have started to specialise and innovate to differentiate themselves. For example, Tenacious Ventures is a $35 million specialised agritech fund, while AfterWork Ventures is a 'community-powered fund' that has coalesced a group of 120 experienced operators from across Australia's startups and tech companies. Its community is invested in its fund, and lean into assist with sourcing and evaluating deal opportunities, as well as supporting companies post-investment.

Several Australian corporates have corporate VC arms, including NAB Ventures, Reinventure (associated with Westpac), IAG Firemark Ventures, and Telstra Ventures.

=== Europe ===
Venture capital in Europe has grown significantly in recent years, investing €96 billion in nearly 27,000 companies between 2013 and 2023. Venture capital investment in 2023 totalled €12.9 billion, with 4,764 companies receiving funding – 99% of which were SMEs. In 2024, European private capital reached €1.25 trillion in assets under management, marking a 2.6x growth over the previous decade.

European venture capital has also delivered strong financial performance. Over the past ten years, VC funds achieved a net IRR of 23.07%, outperforming US VC funds and public market benchmarks such as MSCI Europe. This performance has attracted long-term investors including pension funds, family offices, and corporate investment divisions.

VC-backed companies in Europe employed more than 988,000 jobs at 13,524 mainly SMEs at the end of 2023, highlighting the sector's role in job creation and economic development.

However, despite its growth, venture capital investment in the Europe lags significantly behind the US and China, with the EU capturing only 5% of global venture capital compared to 52% in the US and 40% in China. The financing gap for EU scale-ups is significant, with companies raising 50% less capital than those in Silicon Valley. This disparity exists across industries and is unaffected by the business cycle or year of establishment.

Comparing the EU market to the United States, in 2020 venture capital funding was seven times lower, the EU having fewer unicorns. This hampers the EU's transformation into a green and digital economy. As of 2024, tighter financial conditions have harmed venture capital funding in the European Union, which remains undeveloped in comparison to the United States.

The European Green Deal has fostered policies that contributed to a 30% rise in venture capital specifically for greentech companies in the EU from 2021 to 2023, despite a downturn in other sectors during the same period.

Leading early-stage venture capital investors in Europe included Mark Tluszcz of Mangrove Capital Partners and Danny Rimer of Index Ventures, both of whom were named on Forbes Magazine's Midas List of the world's top dealmakers in technology venture capital in 2007.

=== Nordic countries ===
Recent years have seen a revival of the Nordic venture scene with more than €3 billion raised by VC funds in the Nordic region over the last five years. Over the past five years, a total of €2.7 billion has been invested into Nordic startups. Known Nordic early-stage venture capital funds include NorthZone (Sweden), Maki.vc (Finland) and ByFounders (Copenhagen).

=== Switzerland ===
Many Swiss start-ups are university spin-offs, in particular from its federal institutes of technology in Lausanne and Zurich. According to a study by the London School of Economics analysing 130 ETH Zurich spin-offs over 10 years, about 90% of these start-ups survived the first five critical years, resulting in an average annual IRR of more than 43%. Switzerland's most active early-stage investors are The Zurich Cantonal Bank, investiere.ch, Swiss Founders Fund, as well as a number of angel investor clubs. In 2022, half of the total amount of CHF 4 billion investments went to the ICT and Fintech sectors, whereas 21% was invested in Cleantech.

=== Poland ===
As of March 2019, there are 130 active VC firms in Poland which have invested locally in over 750 companies, an average of 9 companies per portfolio. Since 2016, new legal institutions have been established for entities implementing investments in enterprises in the seed or startup phase. In 2018, venture capital funds invested €178M in Polish startups (0.033% of GDP). As of March 2019, total assets managed by VC companies operating in Poland are estimated at €2.6B. The total value of investments of the Polish VC market is worth €209.2M.

=== Bulgaria ===
The Bulgarian venture capital industry has been growing rapidly in the past decade. As of the beginning of 2021, there are 18 VC and growth equity firms on the local market, with the total funding available for technology startups exceeding €200M. According to BVCA – Bulgarian Private Equity and Venture Capital Association, 59 transactions of total value of €29.4 million took place in 2020. Most of the venture capital investments in Bulgaria are concentrated in the seed and Series A stages. Sofia-based LAUNCHub Ventures recently launched one of the biggest funds in the region, with a target size of €70 million.

=== Asia ===
South Korea has been undergoing an investment boom over the last ten years, peaking at US$10 billion in 2021. The Korean government and mega-corporations such as Kakao, Smilegate, SK, and Lotte has been behind much of the funding, backing both venture firms and accelerators, but new venture capitalists are in dire straits as they announce a 40% cut in financing in 2024.

India is catching up with the West in the field of venture capital and a number of venture capital funds have a presence in the country (IVCA). In 2006, the total amount of private equity and venture capital in India reached $7.5 billion across 299 deals. In the Indian market, venture capital consists of investing in equity, quasi-equity, or conditional loans in order to promote unlisted, high-risk, or high-tech firms driven by technically or professionally qualified entrepreneurs. It is also used to refer to investors "providing seed", "start-up and first-stage financing", or financing companies that have demonstrated extraordinary business potential. Venture capital refers to capital investment; equity and debt; both of which carry indubitable risk. The anticipated risk is very high. The venture capital industry follows the concept of "high risk, high return", innovative entrepreneurship, knowledge-based ideas and human capital intensive enterprises have become common as venture capitalists invest in risky finance to encourage innovation. A large portion of funding from startups in India arise from Foreign Venture Capital Funds such as Sequoia, Accel, Tiger Global, SoftBank, etc.

China is also starting to develop a venture capital industry (CVCA). Greater China venture capital firms have raised $9 billion between January and August 2026, Preqin data showed.

Vietnam is experiencing its first foreign venture capitals, including IDG Venture Vietnam ($100 million) and DFJ Vinacapital ($35 million).

Singapore is widely recognized and featured as one of the hottest places to both start up and invest, mainly due to its healthy ecosystem, its strategic location and connectedness to foreign markets. With 100 deals valued at US$3.5 billion, Singapore saw a record value of PE and VC investments in 2016. The number of PE and VC investments increased substantially over the last 5 years: In 2015, Singapore recorded 81 investments with an aggregate value of US$2.2 billion while in 2014 and 2013, PE and VC deal values came to US$2.4 billion and US$0.9 billion respectively. With 53 percent, tech investments account for the majority of deal volume.

Moreover, Singapore is home to two of South-East Asia's largest unicorns. Garena is reportedly the highest-valued unicorn in the region with a US$3.5 billion price tag, while Grab is the highest-funded, having raised a total of US$1.43 billion since its incorporation in 2012.

Start-ups and small businesses in Singapore receive support from policymakers and the local government fosters the role VCs play to support entrepreneurship in Singapore and the region. For instance, in 2016, Singapore's National Research Foundation (NRF) has given out grants up to around $30 million to four large local enterprises for investments in startups in the city-state. This first of its kind partnership NRF has entered into is designed to encourage these enterprises to source for new technologies and innovative business models.

Currently, the rules governing VC firms are being reviewed by the Monetary Authority of Singapore (MAS) to make it easier to set up funds and increase funding opportunities for start-ups. This mainly includes simplifying and shortening the authorization process for new venture capital managers and to study whether existing incentives that have attracted traditional asset managers here will be suitable for the VC sector. A public consultation on the proposals was held in January 2017 with changes expected to be introduced by July.

In recent years, Singapore's focus in venture capital investments has geared more towards more early stage, deep tech startups, with the government launching SGInnovate in 2016 to support the development of deep tech startups. Deep tech startups aim to address significant scientific problems. Singapore's tech startup scene has grown in recent years, and the city-state ranked seventh in the latest Global Innovation Index 2022. For the first nine months of 2022, investments up to Series B rounds amounted to $5.5 billion Singapore dollars ($4 billion), an increase of 14% by volume and 45% by value, according to data from government agency Enterprise Singapore.

=== Middle East and North Africa ===
The Middle East and North Africa (MENA) venture capital industry is an early stage of development but growing. According to H1 2019 MENA Venture Investment Report by MAGNiTT, 238 startup investment deals have taken place in the region in the first half of 2019, totaling in $471 million in investments. Compared to 2018's H1 report, this represents an increase of 66% in total funding and 28% in number of deals.

According to the report, the UAE is the most active ecosystem in the region with 26% of the deals made in H1, followed by Egypt at 21%, and Lebanon at 13%. In terms of deals by sector, fintech remains the most active industry with 17% of the deals made, followed by e-commerce at 12%, and delivery and transport at 8%.

The report also notes that a total of 130 institutions invested in MENA-based startups in H1 2019, 30% of which were headquartered outside the MENA, demonstrating international appetite for investments in the region. 15 startup exits have been recorded in H1 2019, with Careem's $3.1 billion acquisition by Uber being the first unicorn exit in the region. Other notable exits include Souq.com exit to Amazon in 2017 for $650 million.

=== Israel ===
In Israel, high-tech entrepreneurship and venture capital have flourished well beyond the country's relative size. As it has very little natural resources and, historically has been forced to build its economy on knowledge-based industries, its VC industry has rapidly developed, and nowadays has about 70 active venture capital funds, of which 14 international VCs with Israeli offices, and additional 220 international funds which actively invest in Israel. In addition, as of 2010, Israel led the world in venture capital invested per capita. Israel attracted $170 per person compared to $75 in the US. About two thirds of the funds invested were from foreign sources, and the rest domestic. In 2013, Wix.com joined 62 other Israeli firms on the Nasdaq.

=== Sub-Saharan Africa ===
The Southern African venture capital industry is developing. The South African Government and Revenue Service is following the international trend of using tax-efficient vehicles to propel economic growth and job creation through venture capital. Section 12 J of the Income Tax Act was updated to include venture capital. Companies are allowed to use a tax-efficient structure similar to VCTs in the UK. Despite the above structure, it is commented that government needs to adjust its regulation around intellectual property, exchange control and other legislation to ensure that venture capital succeeds.

Currently, there are not many venture capital funds in operation and it is a small community; however, the number of venture funds are steadily increasing with new incentives slowly coming in from government. Funds are difficult to come by and due to the limited funding, companies are more likely to receive funding if they can demonstrate initial sales or traction and the potential for significant growth. The majority of the venture capital in Sub-Saharan Africa is centered on South Africa and Kenya.

Entrepreneurship is a key to growth. Governments will need to ensure business friendly regulatory environments in order to help foster innovation. In 2019, venture capital startup funding grew to 1.3 billion dollars, increasing rapidly. The causes are as of yet unclear, but education is cited as being a possible factor.

== Confidential information ==
Unlike public companies, information regarding an entrepreneur's business is typically confidential and proprietary. As part of the due diligence process, most venture capitalists will require significant detail with respect to a company's business plan. Entrepreneurs must remain vigilant about sharing information with venture capitalists that are investors in their competitors. Most venture capitalists treat information confidentially, but as a matter of business practice, they do not typically enter into Non Disclosure Agreements because of the potential liability issues those agreements entail. Entrepreneurs are typically well advised to protect truly proprietary intellectual property. Startups commonly use a data room to securely share this information with potential investors during the due diligence process.

Limited partners of venture capital firms typically have access only to limited amounts of information with respect to the individual portfolio companies in which they are invested and are typically bound by confidentiality provisions in the fund's limited partnership agreement.

== Governmental regulations ==
There are several strict guidelines regulating those that deal in venture capital. Namely, they are not allowed to advertise or solicit business in any form as per the U.S. Securities and Exchange Commission guidelines.

== In popular culture ==
=== In books ===
- Mark Coggins' novel Vulture Capital (2002) features a venture capitalist protagonist who investigates the disappearance of the chief scientist in a biotech firm in which he has invested. Coggins also worked in the industry and was co-founder of a dot-com startup.
- Drawing on his experience as reporter covering technology for The New York Times, Matt Richtel produced the novel Hooked (2007), in which the actions of the main character's deceased girlfriend, a Silicon Valley venture capitalist, play a key role in the plot.

=== In comics ===
- In the Dilbert comic strip, a character named "Vijay, the World's Most Desperate Venture Capitalist" frequently makes appearances, offering bags of cash to anyone with even a hint of potential. In one strip, he offers two small children with good math grades money based on the fact that if they marry and produce an engineer baby he can invest in the infant's first idea. The children respond that they are already looking for mezzanine funding.
- Robert von Goeben and Kathryn Siegler produced a comic strip called The VC between 1997 and 2000 that parodied the industry, often by showing humorous exchanges between venture capitalists and entrepreneurs. Von Goeben was a partner in Redleaf Venture Management when he began writing the strip.

=== In film ===
- In Wedding Crashers (2005), Jeremy Grey (Vince Vaughn) and John Beckwith (Owen Wilson) are bachelors who create appearances to play at different weddings of complete strangers, and a large part of the movie follows them posing as venture capitalists from New Hampshire.
- The documentary Something Ventured (2011) chronicled the recent history of American technology venture capitalists.

=== In television ===
- In the TV series Dragons' Den, various startup companies pitch their business plans to a panel of venture capitalists.
- In the ABC reality television show Shark Tank, venture capitalists ("Sharks") hear entrepreneurs' pitches and select which ones they will invest in.
- The short-lived Bravo reality TV show Start-Ups: Silicon Valley had participation from venture capitalists in Silicon Valley.
- The sitcom Silicon Valley parodies startup companies and venture capital culture.
- The AMC Drama Halt and Catch Fire features the use of venture capital firms for the startup companies during the PC revolution of the 1980s and rise of the world-wide-web in the early 1990s.
- The Korean drama Start-Up follows the journey of young entrepreneurs in a fictional South Korean tech hub called Sandbox. It features the character Han Ji-pyeong (Kim Seon-ho) a venture capitalist at the firm SH Venture Capital.

== See also ==
- Angel investor
- Corporate venture capital
- Deep tech
- Enterprise Capital Fund—a type of venture capital fund in the UK
- Equity crowdfunding
- History of private equity and venture capital
- Initial public offering (IPO)
- Joint venture
  - International joint venture
- List of venture capital firms
- Mergers and acquisitions
- Platform cooperative
- Private equity secondary market
- Private equity
- Revenue-based financing
- Seed funding
- Social venture capital
- Sweat equity
- Venture capital financing
- Venture capitalist
- Vulture capitalist
- Women in venture capital
