= Craig Piggott =

New Zealand engineer and entrepreneur

- Born: c. 1994; New Zealand
- Education: St Peter's School, Cambridge
- Alma mater: University of Auckland (BE(Hons))
- Occupations: Engineer, entrepreneur
- Known for: Developing virtual fencing technology
- Title: Founder and chief executive officer of Halter
- Awards: New Zealand Hi-Tech Young Achiever Award (2020); Forbes 30 Under 30 Asia (2021); EY Entrepreneur of the Year New Zealand (2024); New Zealand Innovator of the Year (2026)

Craig Piggott is a New Zealand engineer and entrepreneur, best known as the founder and chief executive officer of Halter, an agritech company that develops livestock management technology using virtual fencing systems.

He has been recognised as one of New Zealand's emerging technology entrepreneurs, with Halter becoming one of the country's fastest-growing companies and expanding into international markets.

== Early life ==
Piggott grew up on dairy farms in the Waikato region, where he was exposed to the routines and demands of farm life from an early age. His parents worked as sharemilkers, often working long hours, before purchasing their own farm.

During this time, he developed practical skills and an understanding of livestock behaviour, alongside an early interest in automation and problem-solving.

He attended St Peter's School in Cambridge as a boarding student and later studied mechanical engineering at the University of Auckland. He initially struggled academically before improving his performance and graduating with First Class Honours.

While at university, he participated in Formula SAE and the Velocity entrepreneurship programme, developing an interest in tackling complex engineering challenges.

== Career ==
=== Early career ===
Piggott joined Rocket Lab as a mechanical engineer during his final year of university.

He later described the experience as formative, particularly exposure to a high-performance start-up environment and the process of raising capital to build a new industry.

After approximately nine months, he left Rocket Lab to start his own company focused on applying engineering and automation to agriculture.

Rocket Lab founder Peter Beck supported the venture and became an early investor and board member.

=== Halter ===
Piggott founded Halter in 2016 at the age of 21, with the aim of improving how farmers manage livestock.

Early prototypes were developed and tested on his family farm, with the product evolving through extensive on-farm experimentation and feedback from farmers.

Under his leadership, Halter developed a system using GPS-enabled solar-powered collars and software — which the company refers to internally as the "cowgorithm" — to enable farmers to manage livestock and grazing remotely without physical fencing. The system uses audio cues and gentle vibrations to contain and move cattle within virtual boundaries, allowing farmers to operate from a smartphone application.

The company expanded from New Zealand into Australia and the United States, supported by multiple funding rounds and rapid growth.

Halter has grown to employ several hundred staff and has raised hundreds of millions of dollars in investment as it scaled internationally.

In 2024, Halter ranked first on New Zealand's Deloitte Fast 50 index, recording revenue growth of 1,539 per cent over three years.

In June 2025, the company raised NZ$165 million (US$100 million) in a Series D funding round at a valuation of approximately NZ$1.65 billion (US$1 billion), led by BOND, with participation from Bessemer Venture Partners, DCVC, NewView, Blackbird, Icehouse Ventures, and Promus Ventures.

Prior to the announcement, the NZ Herald had reported that Halter was in discussions to raise funding at a valuation of up to NZ$3.3 billion. In March 2026, Halter confirmed it had completed a Series E funding round, raising NZ$377 million (US$220 million) at a valuation of NZ$3.4 billion (US$2 billion), led by Founders Fund, the venture capital firm associated with Peter Thiel. Additional investors in the round included Blackbird, DCVC, Bond, Bessemer, NewView, Ubiquity, Promus, and Icehouse Ventures. The raise was reported to be one of the largest in the history of global agritech.

At the time of the Series E, Halter served more than 2,000 farmers and ranchers across New Zealand, Australia, and the United States, with one million solar-powered collars sold. The company announced plans to expand into the United Kingdom, Ireland, and key South American markets later in 2026, and said it would hire more than 220 new roles across New Zealand, Australia, and the United States.

Piggott has also spoken about future applications of the technology, including AI-powered drones for farm management tasks such as counting hay bales and identifying water leaks, and has expressed an ambition for Halter to make farming more appealing to younger generations.

== Approach and leadership ==
Piggott has been described as a hands-on founder who remains closely involved in product development.

He has emphasised resilience in building Halter, noting that several years of development and substantial investment were required before the product proved viable.

His leadership approach has focused on team performance and collective outcomes, with an emphasis on autonomy and decision-making within the organisation.

His background in farming has also influenced his approach, with a focus on developing technology that integrates into real farm environments and responds to feedback from farmers.

== Views on agriculture ==
Piggott has argued that agriculture has historically been underserved by technology, and that there is significant opportunity to improve productivity and sustainability through innovation.

He has emphasised that technology should support farmers' knowledge rather than replace it, particularly in areas such as grazing management and animal health.

== Honours and awards ==
Piggott received the New Zealand Hi-Tech Young Achiever Award in 2020.

He was included in the 2021 Forbes 30 Under 30 Asia list.

In 2024, he won the Technology and Emerging Industries category at EY New Zealand's Entrepreneur of the Year awards.

In 2025, he was named Young Alumnus of the Year by the University of Auckland.

In 2026, he was named New Zealand Innovator of the Year at the Kiwibank New Zealander of the Year Awards.

He was also shortlisted in the startup category of the BusinessDesk CEO Index.
