= Blackbird Ventures =

Australian venture capital firm

Blackbird Ventures is an Australian venture capital firm that provides seed and early-stage funding to Australian and New Zealand startups, including Canva, Airwallex, Zoox and VeVe. It has raised over $1 billion in capital and as of April 2023 manages 5 funds.

== History ==
Blackbird Ventures was founded in Sydney in 2012 by Niki Scevak and Rick Baker. Its first fund, raised in 2013, was approximately A$29 million and included an early investment in Canva. The firm's subsequent funds increased in size, including a second fund of approximately A$200 million in 2015 and a third fund of A$225 million in 2018. Investors in the third fund included Hostplus, Aware Super and the Australian Government's Future Fund.

Blackbird expanded into New Zealand in 2020, establishing an Auckland office headed by general partner Samantha Wong. In 2020 it closed its first dedicated New Zealand fund at approximately NZ$60 million. The government-backed Elevate NZ Venture Fund, managed by New Zealand Growth Capital Partners, committed NZ$22.75 million to the fund.

In 2020, Blackbird raised a further A$500 million fund, at the time one of the largest venture capital funds raised in Australia.

In November 2022, Blackbird raised the largest Australian venture capital fund worth A$1 billion. Their fifth fund included investments from superannuation funds including AustralianSuper, Hostplus, HESTA, Aware Super, and also Australia's sovereign wealth fund, the Australian Government Future Fund.

In August 2026, Blackbird closed its sixth fund at A$1.05 billion. New institutional investors included Adams Street Partners, Morgan Stanley Investment Management and Schroders, alongside some existing superannuation funds.

== Investments ==
Blackbird Ventures primarily invests in technology companies from pre-seed and seed stages, while reserving capital for follow-on investments in later funding rounds. Its best-known early investment was in Australian design-software company Canva, which became the largest contributor to the value of Blackbird's portfolio. In 2025, Canva accounted for more than 60 per cent of the reported value of Blackbird's portfolio.

Other companies backed by Blackbird have included Airwallex, Zoox, SafetyCulture, Culture Amp, Redactive AI, VeVe, Halter, Partly, Foundry Lab and Tracksuit
