= Nofence =

Norwegian business

Nofence is a Norwegian company that makes GPS collars for farm animals (cattle, sheep, and goats) that discourage them from crossing virtual fence boundaries.

Oscar Hovde Berntsen has been working on the idea of virtual fencing, as an alternative to fixed electric fencing, since the 1990s. Nofence was incorporated in 2011. In 2016, there was a pilot project in Norway with 850 goats. The Norwegian Food Safety Authority approved the use of Nofence for goats in 2017, then for cattle and sheep in 2020. Nofence were founded in Batnfjordsøra, Norway, and is today based in Molde, Trondheim, and Oslo in Norway, with offices in the United Kingdom, Ireland, Spain and the United States.

The solar-powered collars play an audible tone when the animal reaches the pasture boundary, and if they continue, the collar delivers a small shock, similar to what an animal might receive from a fixed electric fence. Farmers can use a mobile app to change boundaries and monitor the animals throughout the day, and avoid over-grazing. Fenceless grazing is being supported by conservationists and farmers, particularly in sensitive areas or difficult upland areas where physical fencing would be impractical, expensive or inappropriate.

In September 2020, The Times reported that trials were being conducted at six sites in the UK, including Epping Forest in Essex.

In December 2020, Nofence stated that 17,000 collars were in use in Norway.

By January 2025, over 150,000 collars were in use worldwide, and the number of customers had surpassed 8,000.

In May 2025, Nofence featured on the farming documentary show Clarkson's Farm.
