= Virtual fencing (livestock) =

Systems creating virtual barriers for animals and wildlife safety

Cattle turning at a virtual boundary in Colorado in response to tones from their collars.

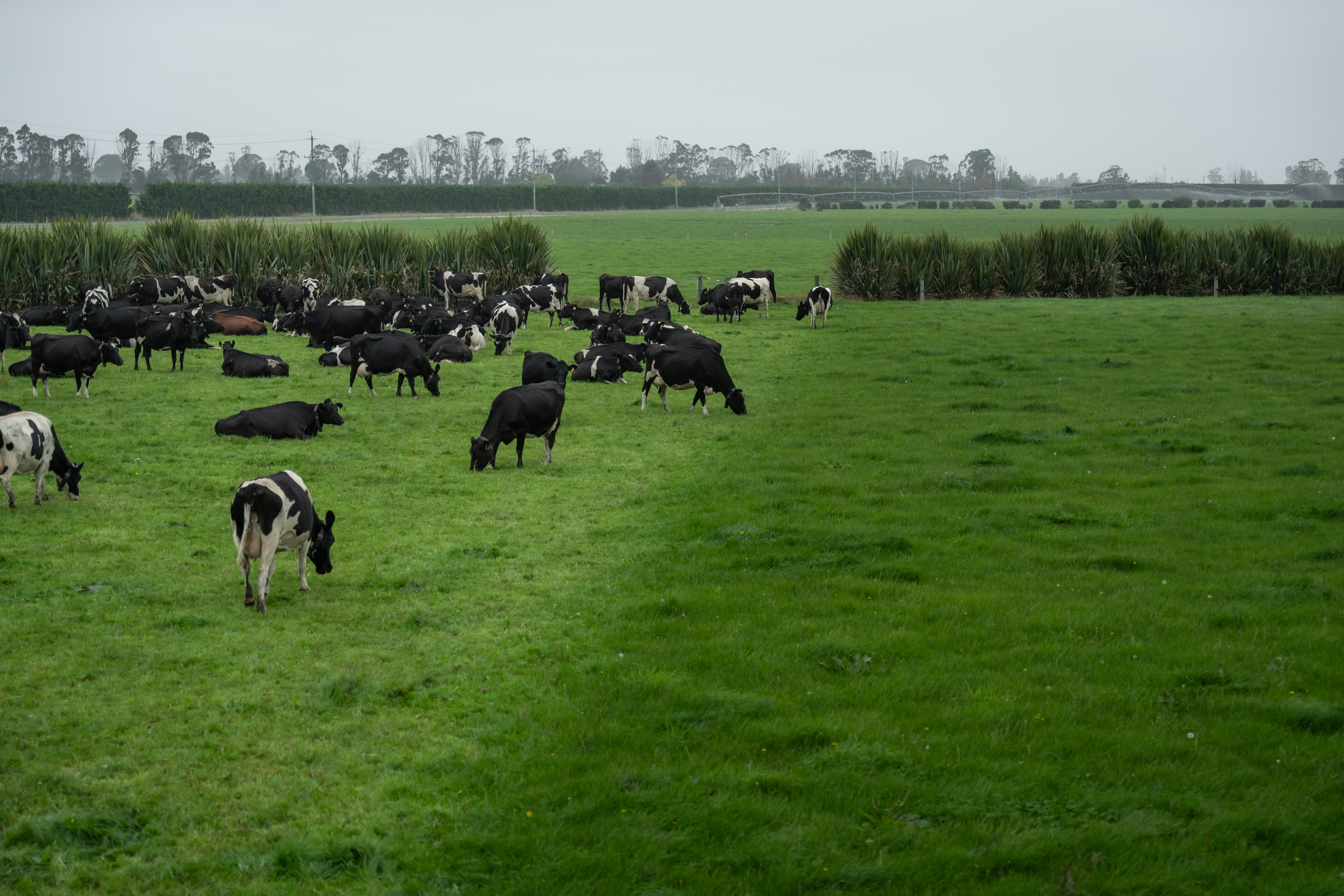
Dairy cows grazing and resting on pasture on an overcast day with a visible graze line

Virtual fencing in livestock management is a technology that uses GPS-enabled collars and software to create movable, invisible boundaries that guide or restrict animal movement without the need for physical fences. Animals approaching a virtual boundary receive escalating cues from the collar, typically an audio warning followed by a brief electrical stimulus if they continue, which conditions most animals to respond to the sound alone after a short training period.

== History ==
=== Livestock management ===
Research on electronically mediated control of grazing animals dates back to the late 20th century, with prototypes and reviews describing non-physical boundaries enforced by aversive cues. In Australia, the national science agency CSIRO began work on virtual fencing for cattle in the mid-2000s, research that later underpinned the eShepherd product. In Norway, Nofence was established in 2011, and piloted collars with commercial goat herds before regulatory approvals for goats (2017) and later cattle and sheep. In New Zealand, Halter began commercialising its virtual fencing and herding platform for pasture-based dairying in 2016 and later expanded into beef production and international markets.

== Technology ==
Most systems combine three elements: GPS location in a collar or neckband, wireless connectivity to transmit data and receive fence updates, and a farm or cloud application to draw, move and schedule boundaries. Signals to animals are delivered as a pre-warning sound and, if needed, a mild electrical pulse. Collars may connect via on-farm radio gateways with backhaul to the internet, or directly through cellular networks.

=== Examples ===
- Halter (New Zealand), a virtual fencing and guided-herding platform integrating collars, farm towers and software.
- Nofence (Norway), solar-powered GPS collars for cattle, sheep and goats, using the cellular network and a mobile app.
- Vence by Merck Animal Health, used on North American rangelands, often with gateway towers on extensive allotments.
- eShepherd by Gallagher Group, derived from CSIRO research, using solar neckbands and a mobile app.

== Applications ==
Virtual fencing is used to:

- rotate and subdivide pasture in dairy and beef systems, including virtual back fences to protect regrowth;
- exclude stock from riparian zones, wetlands and other sensitive habitats with precise setbacks;
- create dynamic grazing cells or fuel breaks for wildfire mitigation on public lands;
- manage small ruminants for conservation and weed control on rough terrain.

== Animal behaviour and welfare ==
The system relies on associative learning between the audio cue and the subsequent brief electric stimulus. Peer-reviewed studies report that cattle typically learn to respond to the audio cue within days, with pulse exposure declining markedly after initial training. A 2024 Journal of Dairy Science study of Halter collars in an intensive dairy setting found effective containment and remote herding, with many cows receiving no pulses once trained. In 2022 the United Kingdom’s Animal Welfare Committee concluded that virtual fencing can be used without detriment to welfare when safeguards are in place, including limits on stimulus, defined training protocols and monitoring. A 2023 literature review commissioned by the Australian Government found welfare risks are greatest during learning and can be mitigated by predictable cues, controllability and operator training, while noting the need for long-term data and evaluation for species beyond cattle. In Aotearoa New Zealand the SPCA has questioned whether virtual fencing collars on cattle meet public expectations for animal welfare and has signed a petition calling for an inquiry.

== Environmental effects ==
By removing or reducing the need for mesh or wire, virtual fencing reduces wildlife entanglement and landscape fragmentation compared with permanent fences, while allowing managers to keep livestock out of waterways and wetlands in line with livestock exclusion rules. Field projects and catchment programmes have used virtual fencing to maintain high exclusion rates from riparian buffers and have monitored associated water quality improvements, including in Great Barrier Reef catchments. On rangelands, land agencies have deployed towers to direct cattle after wildfires as part of adaptive post-fire grazing programmes.

== Economics ==
Economic competitiveness depends on terrain size, connectivity, and the cost of fencing it replaces. Analysis by the University of Arizona Cooperative Extension suggests whilst virtual fencing struggles in Arizona under baseline conditions, it can be cost-competitive when used as an alternative to installing extensive new fencing or when paired with conservation cost-sharing programs.

== Adoption ==
Adoption has accelerated across pasture-based dairying and extensive beef systems.

New Zealand

Origin market for Halter, with uptake on dairy platforms and expansion into beef. In 2025 Halter raised a growth round valuing the company at US$1 billion for international expansion.

Australia

In Australia, states and territories regulate use. The state of Victoria announced draft regulations to permit virtual fencing for cattle by the end of 2025, and New South Wales likewise announced plans to legalise virtual fencing for cattle across the state. At the federal level, an Australian Animal Welfare Guide for Virtual Fencing is being prepared via the AWTG.

United States

Virtual fencing is referenced in National Resource Conservation Service materials and used on private and public rangelands. The Bureau of Land Management and partners have installed towers to steer cattle for rangeland health and wildfire objectives.

Europe and the United Kingdom

As of 2022, the United Kingdom had over 140 virtual fencing users, mostly for cattle, and uptake was expected to increase markedly. A widely viewed example was shown in 2025 on Clarkson's Farm, where goats at Diddly Squat Farm wore Nofence collars to clear dense bramble and scrub in hard-to-fence areas. Virtual boundaries were drawn and adjusted in a smartphone app, allowing quick redeployment without temporary netting or permanent fencing, and helping popularise the approach among UK graziers.

== Legal and policy status ==
=== New Zealand ===
Virtual fencing is used under general animal-welfare law rather than a technology-specific code. In August 2025 the Government published its Cabinet response to a Petitions Committee report on holding an inquiry into virtual fencing, reflecting ongoing policy attention. Separately, stock-exclusion regulations under the Resource Management Act 1991 require excluding specified stock from lakes, wide rivers and natural wetlands, which can be achieved by permanent fencing or by stock-management tools that prevent access, including virtual fencing.

=== Australia ===
Use is regulated by states and territories. In 2025 Victoria and New South Wales announced regulatory changes to enable commercial use for cattle, with a national welfare guide under development through the AWTG.

=== United Kingdom and Europe ===
The UK Animal Welfare Committee’s 2022 opinion sets out principles for acceptable use and safeguards. Some European countries restrict shock-based collars for livestock. Sweden has indicated that approval would require evidence of welfare outcomes equivalent to conventional electric fencing.

=== United States ===
Fencing statutes are mainly state-based and predate virtual fencing, but federal conservation and land-management programmes reference the technology in prescribed grazing and rangeland projects.

== Research ==
Empirical work has evaluated learning curves, pulse exposure and behavioural responses in dairy and beef cattle, finding high containment after acclimation and minimal ongoing stress under appropriate protocols. A 2023 Australian government review identified gaps in long-term welfare data, device reliability and evidence beyond cattle, while a 2024 paper in Biological Conservation proposed ethical and policy frameworks for virtual fencing in biodiversity and land-management contexts.

== Criticism and controversy ==
Concerns focus on the use of aversive stimuli, risks during training, device-failure modes and social acceptability in export markets. In New Zealand, welfare organisations such as the New Zealand SPCA have questioned whether shock-based collars meet public expectations and have proposed limits and monitoring requirements; in February 2024 the SPCA supported a parliamentary petition seeking an inquiry into whether shock-based virtual fencing for dairy cattle is acceptable to the public, consumers and export markets. In August 2025 the New Zealand Government issued its response to the Petitions Committee. It noted the recommendation to include guidance on virtual fencing in the update of the Code of Welfare: Dairy Cattle, including use near milking sheds, and recorded that the draft Code had been returned to the National Animal Welfare Advisory Committee in 2024 to reconsider key areas. Evaluation materials outlined a proposed minimum standard that equipment be designed, constructed, maintained and used to minimise the likelihood of distress, pain or injury, with cattle that do not adapt to the audio cue managed by alternative means, and recommended best practice that aversive techniques not be used for training.

== See also ==
- Electric fence
- Rotational grazing
- Animal welfare
- Precision agriculture
