= Halter (company) =

New Zealand agricultural technology company

- Type: Private
- Industry: Agricultural technology
- Founded: 2016; 10 years ago in Auckland, New Zealand
- Founder: Craig Piggott
- Headquarters: Auckland, New Zealand
- Key people: Craig Piggott (CEO)
- Products: Solar-powered virtual fencing collars and software
- Services: Pasture management and animal monitoring software
- Website: halterhq.com

Halter is a New Zealand agricultural technology company that develops solar-powered cattle collars and farm management software for virtual fencing, animal monitoring, and pasture management. It is based in Auckland.

== History ==
Halter was founded in 2016 by Craig Piggott and Max Olson. Piggott grew up on a dairy farm near Matamata, New Zealand and studied mechanical engineering at the University of Auckland before working at Rocket Lab.

The company raised approximately NZ$7 million in 2018 from investors including Promus Ventures, Rocket Lab founder Peter Beck, Sir Stephen Tindall and Icehouse Ventures. In 2021, Halter raised NZ$32 million in a Series B round led by Blackbird Ventures, with the funding intended to expand its commercial deployment and workforce.

In March 2023, Halter announced its Series C funding round of NZ$85 million, led by Bessemer Venture Partners. Other participants included DCVC, Blackbird Ventures, Peter Beck and Icehouse Ventures. At the time, the company employed around 180 people and had expanded deployment of its technology from the Waikato to farms throughout the country.

In 2022, Halter began operating commercially in Tasmania. In 2023, the ABC described it as the first company to offer virtual fencing commercially in Australia.

In August 2024, Halter announced its United States launch for beef and dairy operations.

In 2025, Halter's technology was used on public lands in California for rotational grazing and fuel-break maintenance in partnership with the Bureau of Land Management. In June 2025 Halter announced a Series D funding round reported as US$100 million at a valuation of about NZ$1.65 billion (around US$1 billion).

In 2026, Halter raised $220 million in a Series E funding round at a $2 billion valuation. The company said the funding would support expansion into the United Kingdom, Ireland and other international markets.

== Awards and recognition ==
- 2024: Deloitte Fast 50 (New Zealand), ranked first overall.
- 2025: TIME Best Inventions (Special Mention) recognising Halter's virtual fencing system.

== See also ==
- Agricultural technology
- Precision agriculture
- Virtual fencing
- Rotational grazing
- Animal welfare in New Zealand
