= Electric fence =

Shock barrier to contain animals or people

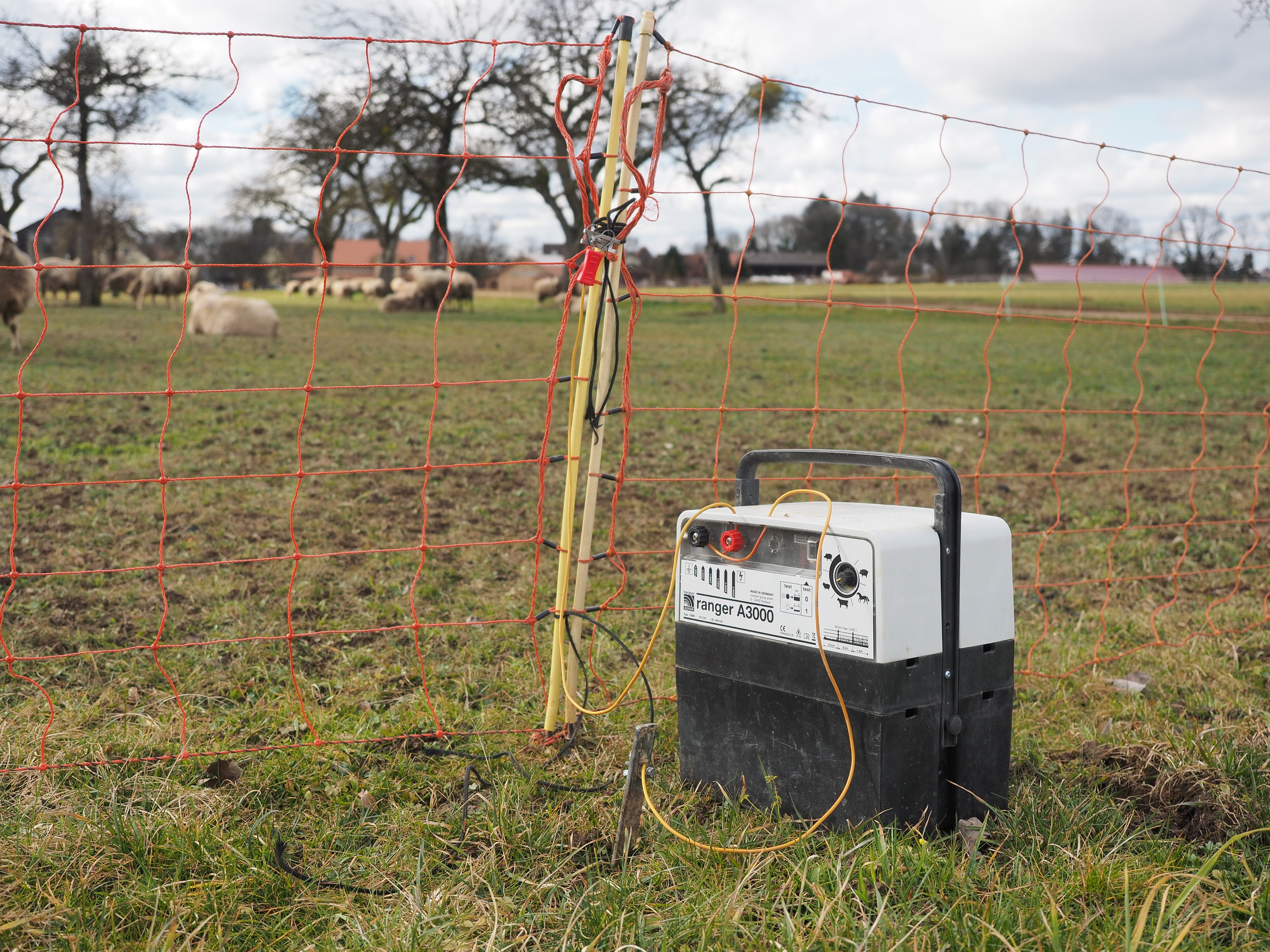
Charger for a plus-minus net fence

An electric fence is a barrier that uses electric shocks to deter humans and animals (Note: From this point, "animal" is used to refer to both humans and other animals for simplicity, except where the text refers to "livestock".) from crossing a boundary. Most electric fences are used for agricultural purposes and other non-human animal control. They are also commonly used to protect high-security areas such as military installations or prisons, where a potentially lethal voltage may be applied. Virtual electric fences for livestock using GPS technology have also been developed.

== Design and function ==
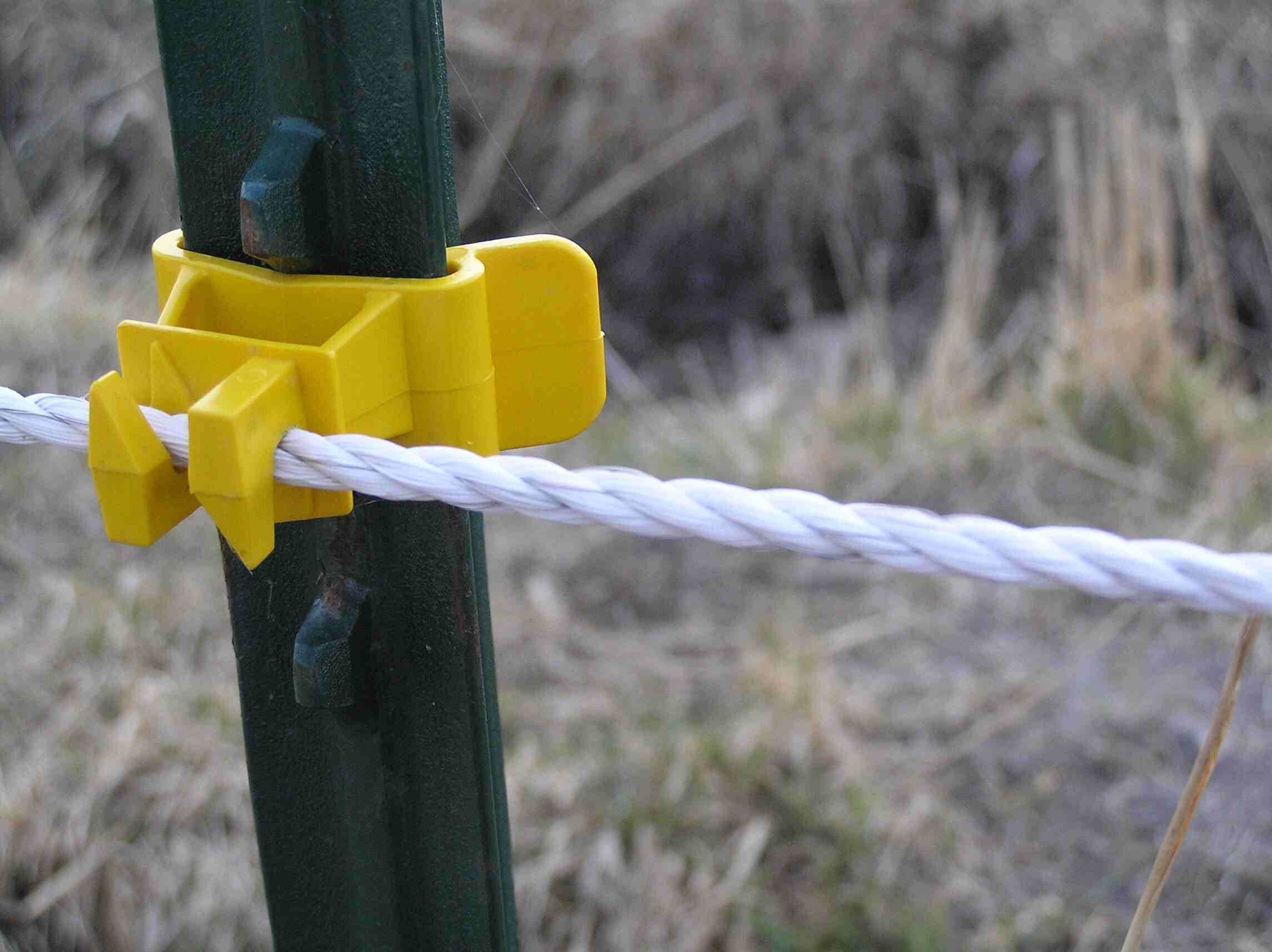
Detail of an electric fence material made of synthetic cord with thin stainless steel wire interwoven through it, attached to a steel fence post with a plastic insulator. This material is more visible than wire, but most often used for temporary fencing.

Electric fences are designed to shock animals or humans if they attempt to cross a boundary. A component called a power energiser converts power into a brief high voltage pulse. One terminal of the power energiser releases an electrical pulse along a connected bare wire approximately once per second. Another terminal is connected to a metal rod implanted in the earth, called a ground or earth rod. An animal touching both the wire and the earth during a pulse would complete an electrical circuit, conducting a pulse, resulting in an electric shock. The effects of a shock depend upon the voltage, the energy of the pulse, the degree of contact between the recipient and the fence and ground, and the route of the current through the body; the severity of the shock can range from barely noticeable to lethal.

=== Fence energisers ===
Most modern electric fences emit pulses of high voltage at a fixed time interval or use a voltage multiplier to store a high voltage that is applied continuously to the fence except when recharging after a shock.

Depending on the fenced area and the remoteness of its location, fence energisers may be hooked into a permanent electrical circuit or run by lead-acid or dry cell batteries or a smaller battery kept charged by a solar panel. The power consumption of a fence in good condition is low, and so a lead-acid battery powering several hundred metres of the fence may last for several weeks on a single charge. Certain energisers have the ability to be powered by multiple sources.

Early alternating current (AC) fence chargers used a transformer and a mechanically driven switch to generate the electrical pulses. The pulses were wide and the voltage unpredictable, with no-load peaks in excess of 10,000 volts and a rapid drop in voltage as the fence leakage increased, which had the liability of the switch mechanism failing. Later systems replaced this switch with a solid-state circuit. This circuit had an improvement in longevity but no change in pulse width or voltage control.

"Weed burner" fence chargers were popular for a time and featured a longer-duration output pulse that would destroy weeds touching the fence. These were responsible for many grass fires when used during dry weather. Although still available, they have declined in popularity.

=== Fencing materials ===
Smooth steel wire is the material most often used for electric fences, ranging from a fine thin wire used as a single line to thicker, high-tensile (HT) wire. Less often, woven wire or barbed wire fences can be electrified, though such practices create a more hazardous fence, particularly if an animal becomes caught by the fencing material, causing electrified barbed wire to be made unlawful in some areas. Synthetic webbing and rope-like fencing materials woven with fine conducting wires (usually of stainless steel) became available in the late 1990s and are particularly useful for areas requiring additional visibility or temporary fencing.

The electrified fence itself must be kept insulated from the earth and from any materials that will conduct electricity and ignite or short out the fence. Fencing must therefore avoid vegetation, and cannot be attached directly to wood or metal posts. Typically, wooden or metal posts are driven into the ground and plastic or porcelain insulators are attached to them, or plastic posts are used. The conducting material is then attached to the posts.

=== Palisade fences ===
Electrified palisade fences are usually made from painted mild steel, galvanised steel, stainless steel or aluminium. Typically, these fences are 2.4 metres (7 ft 10 in) tall and send high voltage electric pulses through the palisade at a frequency of 1 Hz (one pulse per second).

Palisade electric fences are used in most countries, particularly where there is little vegetation to short-circuit the fence or where the costs of security personnel are high in relation to automated security equipment. The electric pulse is a strong deterrent for criminals, while the palisade fence is mechanically stronger than a typical steel cable electric fence, being able to withstand impact from wildlife, small falling trees and wildfires.

Due to the high levels of crime in South Africa, it is common for residential houses to have perimeter defences. The City of Johannesburg promotes the use of palisade fencing over opaque, usually brick, walls as criminals cannot hide as easily behind the fence. The City of Johannesburg manual on safety describes best practices and maintenance of palisade fencing, such as not growing vegetation in front of palisades as this allows criminals to make an unseen breach.

=== Virtual electric fence ===
In a virtual electric fence system, each animal has a collar with a GPS unit which is set to produce first an audible warning and then a shock as the animal approaches a programmable boundary. Pet fences to control domestic dogs have been used since 1973, and the first system for livestock control was developed by Peck's Invisible Fence Co, now Invisible Fence Inc., in 1987. An early application involved goats and Euphorbia esula. Virtual fencing has been used by the Royal Society for the Protection of Birds in England to control grazing in wild and sensitive landscapes without the need for expensive and visually intrusive fencing. Companies which have developed this technology include the Norwegian Nofence, the Australian Agersens (brand name eShepherd) and the American Vence.

In many countries such as Switzerland or Austria, virtual electric fences are currently not allowed due to concerns about animal welfare. In 2023 and 2024, industry-funded studies by the Venn Research Association and Agroscope found their effect on goats and cows to be comparable to traditional electric fences.

== History ==
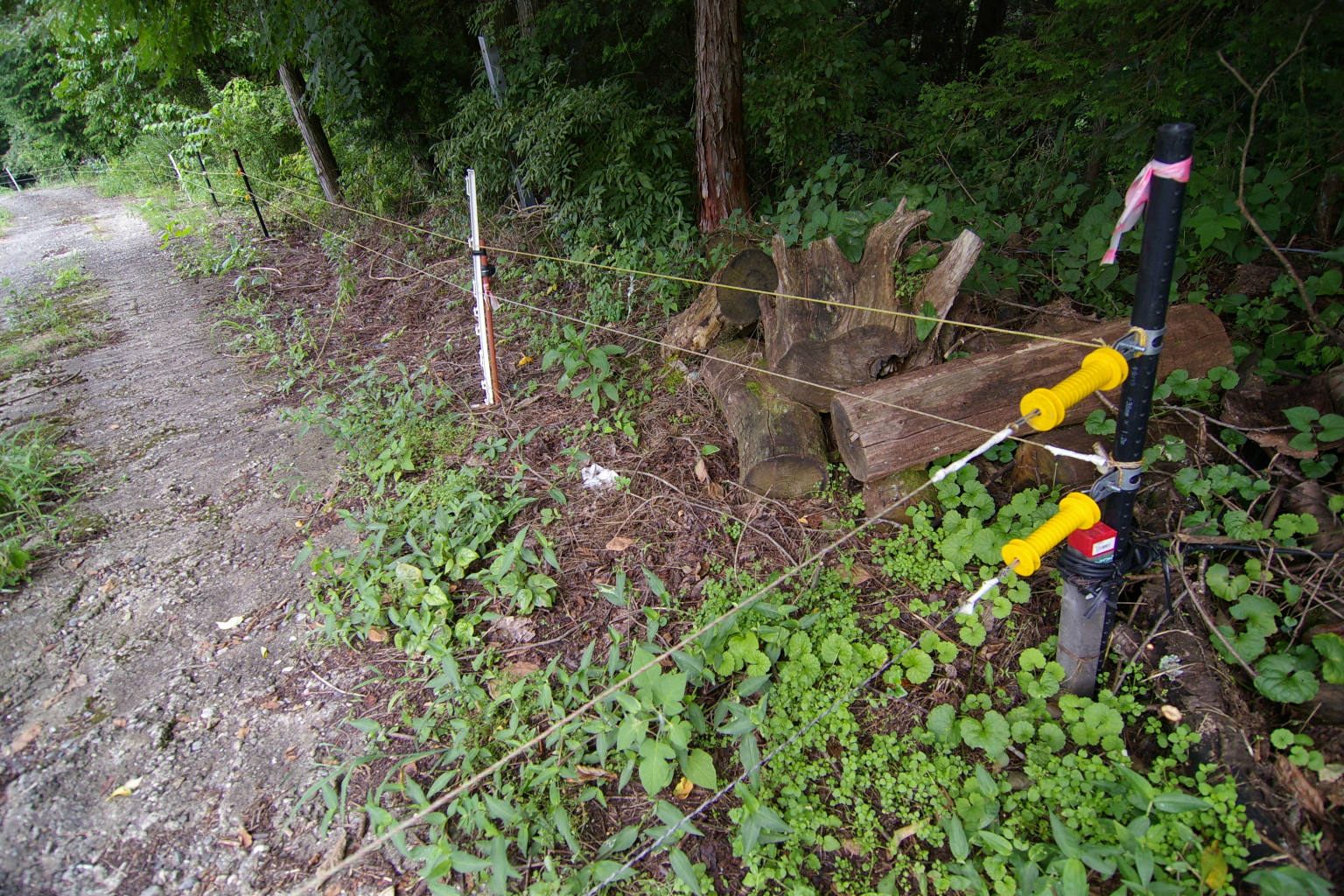
Electric fence in urban environment

First published in 1832, Chapter 7 of Domestic Manners of the Americans by Fanny Trollope describes an arrangement of wires connected with an electrical machine used to protect a display called "Dorfeuille's Hell" in the Western Museum of natural history in Cincinnati, which she herself invented. Published in 1870, Chapter 22 of Jules Verne's Twenty Thousand Leagues Under the Seas, describes "The Lightning Bolts of Captain Nemo" – the use of electrification of a structure as a defensive weapon. Published in 1889, Mark Twain's novel A Connecticut Yankee in King Arthur's Court, uses an electric fence for defensive purposes.

David H. Wilson obtained United States Patent 343,939 in 1886, combining protection, an alarm bell, and telephone communications. He constructed an experimental 30-mile electric fence energised by a water wheel in Texas in 1888, which proved successful at keeping cattle separated, but was deemed impractical as a business venture.

In 1905, the Russian army improvised electric fences during the Russo-Japanese War at Port Arthur. In 1915, during World War I, the German army installed the "Wire of Death", an electrified fences along the border between Belgium and the Netherlands to prevent unauthorised movement of people across the border. The fences covered 300 kilometres (190 mi) and consisted of several strands of copper wire, backed with barbed wire, and energised to several thousand volts. An estimated 3,000 human fatalities, as well as the destruction of livestock, were caused by the fence.

Electric fences were used to control livestock in the United States in the early 1930s, and electric fencing technology developed in both the United States and New Zealand.

An early application of the electric fence for livestock control was developed in 1936–1937 by New Zealand inventor Bill Gallagher. Built from a car ignition trembler coil set, Gallagher used the device to keep his horse from scratching itself against his car. Gallagher later started the Gallagher Group to improve and market the design. In 1962, another New Zealand inventor, Doug Phillips, invented the non-shortable electric fence based on capacitor discharge. This significantly increased the range an electric fence could be used from a few hundred metres to 35 kilometres (22 mi), and reduced the cost of fencing by more than 80%. The non-shortable electric fence was patented by Phillips and by 1964 was manufactured by Plastic Products, a New Zealand firm, under the name "Waikato Electric Fence". Since then, a variety of plastic insulators are now used on farms throughout the world.

By 1939, public safety concerns in the United States prompted Underwriters' Laboratories to publish a bulletin on electric shock from electric fences, leading to the ANSI/UL standard No. 69 for electric fence controllers.

In 1969, Robert B. Cox, a farmer in Adams County, Iowa, invented an improved electric fence bracket and was issued United States Patent No. 3,516,643 on 23 June 1970. This bracket improved electric fences by keeping the wire high enough above the ground and far enough away from the fence to permit grass and weeds growing beneath the wire to be mowed. The brackets attached to the posts by what may be called a "pivot bind" or "torsion-lock". The weight of the bracket, the attached insulator and the electric wire attached to the insulator bind the bracket to the post.

=== Improvements ===
Electric fencing has changed significantly as materials, engineering, and regulations have caught up with practical needs in the field. One of the earliest improvements came in the 1960s, when polyethylene insulators began replacing porcelain. They were cheaper, lighter, and far less likely to break, which made fences easier to build and maintain.

The fence energiser, known as a “charger” in the United States and a “fencer” in the United Kingdom, also improved over time. Better electrical design made power delivery more reliable and consistent. At the same time, laws governing electric fences began to shift. In some places, certain electrical outputs were not permitted until the mid twentieth century. Elsewhere, signage rules and other restrictions limited where fences could be used. Many U.S. cities still have older bylaws that prohibit electric fencing to prevent agricultural fences from appearing in urban neighbourhoods, although some have modernized these rules. Houston, Texas, for example, revised its ordinance in 2008.

Further advances followed in materials. High tensile steel wire was introduced in New Zealand in the 1970s and later adopted in the United States in the 1980s, allowing longer runs of fence with fewer posts. New synthetic options also appeared, including webbing and rope-style fencing woven with fine conducting wires. These designs improved visibility and flexibility without sacrificing electrical performance.

More recent designs have focused on adaptability. Moveable fence components, such as the Tumble-wheel, made temporary single-wire fences easier to use for rotational grazing. The insulated central hub allows the fence to stay powered even while it is being moved, reflecting a broader shift toward flexible and management-friendly electric fencing systems.

== Uses ==
=== Agriculture ===
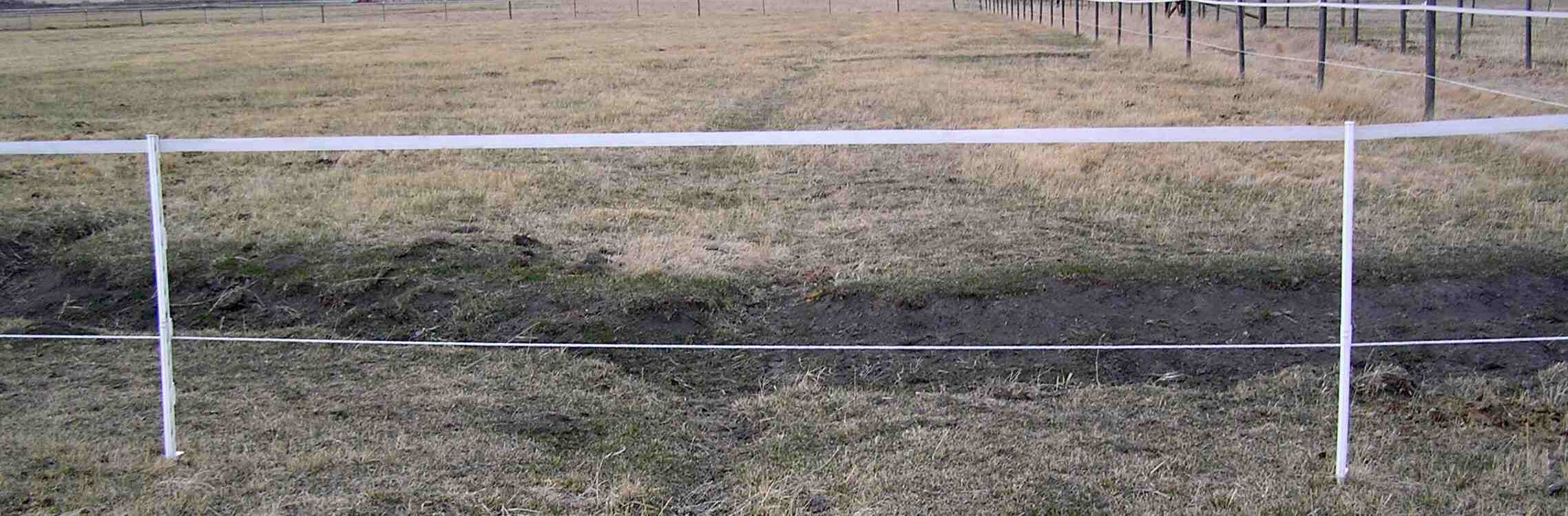
A temporary electric fence of synthetic materials and plastic step-in posts set about 12 feet apart

Electric fencing is widely used in agriculture because it is inexpensive, quick to install, and less likely to injure livestock than barbed or woven wire fences. It uses light construction, relying on animals learning to avoid the shock rather than being physically restrained.

Its drawbacks include vulnerability to power loss, wire breaks, shorting from vegetation, fire risk in dry conditions, and limited visibility. Electric lines are often added to conventional fences or used temporarily for rotational grazing, using portable posts and battery or solar energisers. Most animals learn to respect electric fences, though some adapt if power is inconsistent.

Electric fences are widely used to control the movement of wild animals and reduce human–wildlife conflict. Common applications include deterring deer from entering private property, preventing animals from accessing airport runways, protecting crops from wild boar, and discouraging geese from occupying public spaces. In Africa and Asia, electrified fencing has been extensively employed to reduce conflict between humans and large mammals, particularly elephants.

In addition to large-scale conservation uses, electric fencing has increasingly been adopted in small-scale livestock farming to exclude wild animals, including potential predators. Electrified fences are now commonly used on both domestic livestock farms and wildlife (game) farms in Africa to prevent predators from entering or leaving fenced areas. However, a range of species, including non-predatory ones, may also attempt to cross these barriers, often by digging underneath the fence, which can lead to unintended consequences.

The effectiveness of electrified fences is offset by the risk of lethal electric shock to a number of species, including vulnerable and endangered animals. Documented fatalities include the African ground pangolin (Smutsia temminckii), the southern African python (Python natalensis), and several species of tortoise.

In South Africa, it is estimated that more than 31,500 reptiles—predominantly tortoises—are killed annually as a result of contact with electrified fences. Annual mortality estimates for the African ground pangolin range from 377 to 1,028 individuals. The impact of electrified fencing on other taxa, such as monitor lizards (Varanus spp.), has not been comprehensively quantified.

Pangolins are particularly vulnerable due to their distinctive locomotion and defensive behaviour. They walk in a semi-bipedal posture, moving on their hind legs while holding their forelimbs and tail off the ground, which leaves the ventral surface relatively unprotected. Depending on fence design and the height of the lowest electrified strands, a pangolin's head or exposed underside may contact a live wire. The initial shock typically triggers the animal's primary defence response—curling into a ball—which can result in the pangolin inadvertently wrapping itself around the electrified wire. Once entangled, the animal may receive repeated electrical pulses, causing it to curl progressively tighter around the live wire. This often results in death from sustained electric shock. Individuals that are not killed immediately may later succumb to dehydration, starvation or exposure. Pangolins found dead on electric fences frequently exhibit epidermal burns, sometimes penetrating through the protective scales, and may also sustain significant internal injuries. Animals found alive after prolonged exposure often suffer severe neurological damage and frequently do not survive even after release.

=== Security ===
==== Non-lethal fence ====
Security electric fences are electric fences constructed using specialised equipment and built for perimeter security as opposed to animal management. Security electric fences consist of wires that carry pulses of electric current to provide a non-lethal shock to deter potential intruders. Tampering with the fence also results in an alarm that is logged by the security electric fence energiser, and can also trigger a siren, strobe, or notifications to a control room or directly to the owner via email or phone.

In practical terms, security electric fences are a type of perimeter intrusion detection sensor array that act as a (or part of a) physical barrier, a psychological deterrent to potential intruders, and as part of a security alarm system.

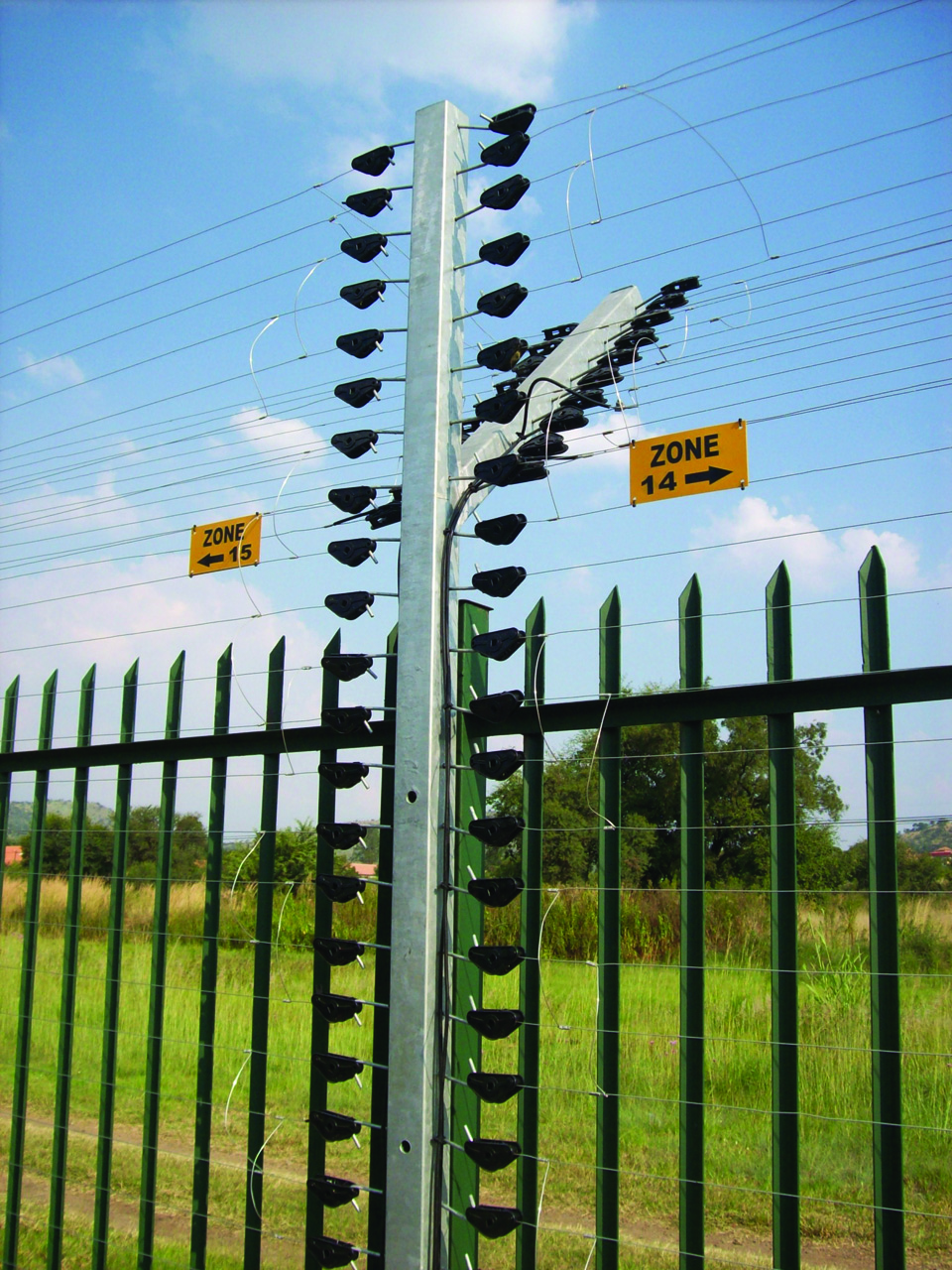
Multi-zone security electric fence used alongside a physical barrier

Non-lethal electric fences are used by both private and government-sector bodies to prevent trespass. These include freight carriers, auto auctions, equipment rental companies, auto dealers, housing communities, commercial factories or warehouses, prisons, military bases, and government buildings. Many of these electric fences act as monitored security alarm systems in addition to causing an uncomfortable shock. Electrified palisade fences are used to protect isolated property and high security facilities, but also around some residential homes.

They can also be used inside a building, for example as a grid behind windows or skylights to prevent people from climbing through. They have also been used on yachts and on large ships to deter pirates.

Electric fences are occasionally employed to discourage suicide attempts on tall structures, and to reduce the incidence of graffiti and other petty crime.

Due to the high levels of crime in South Africa, it is common for residential houses to have perimeter defences, such as electric fences. Electrified palisade fences are commonly used.

Types of security electric fences include:

Piggyback
A piggyback electric fence is mounted off the back of an existing wire or mesh fence, adding another level of security to the existing perimeter barrier. The piggyback profile is fastened to existing fence posts (e.g. pillars of a palisade fence) using rivets or screws. These are the most commonly used security electric fences.
Wall top
Wall-top electric fences attach to the top of an existing perimeter barrier such as a masonry wall. These are the second most common type of security electric fences.
Stand alone
Stand-alone electric fences act as the sole perimeter barrier. This type is normally found as one of many layers of perimeter security around high security establishments, meaning that in order touch it, an intruder would have had to previously bypass at least one physical barrier.

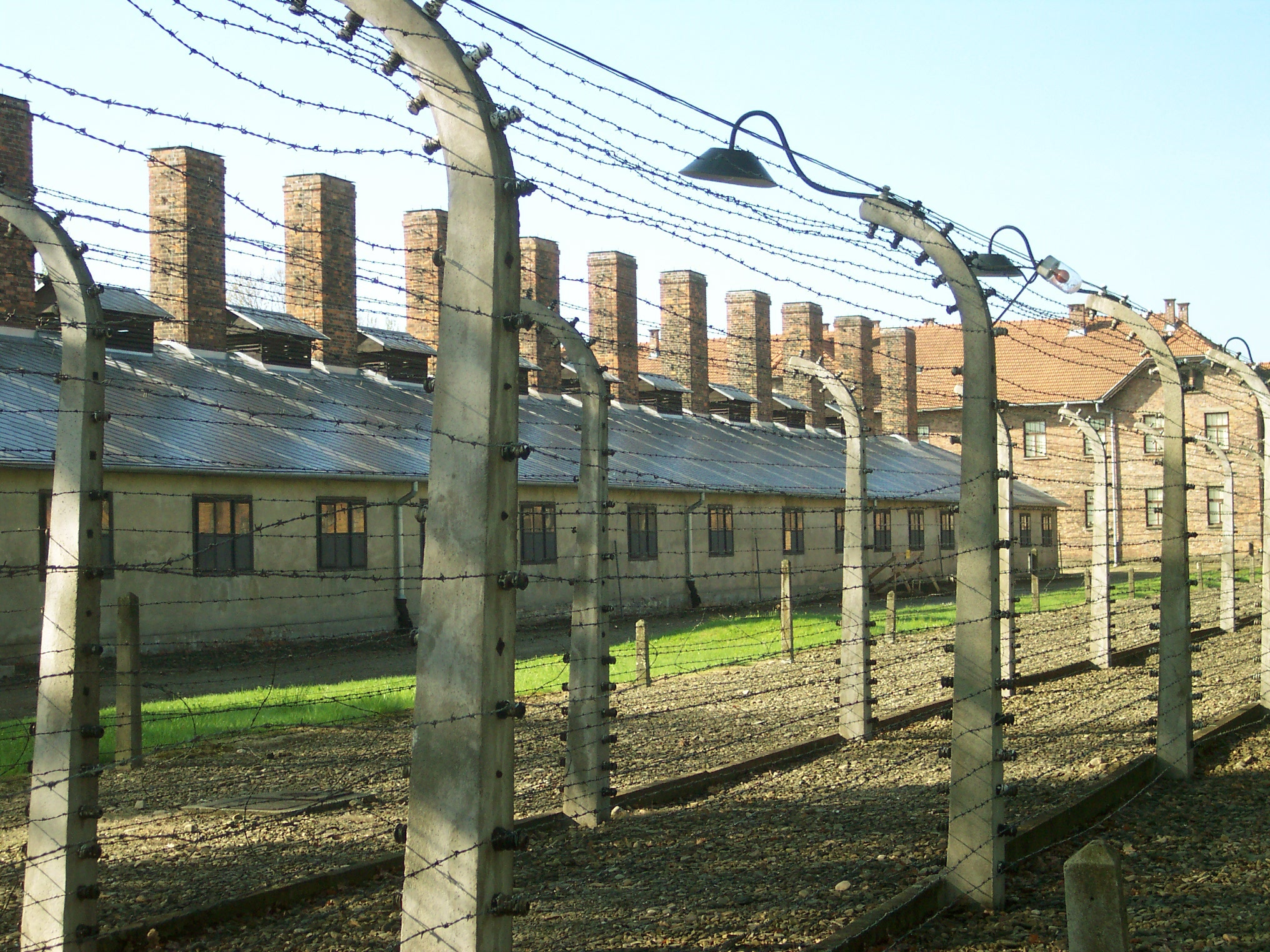
Nazi concentration camps were surrounded by electric fences, like this one shown above at Auschwitz.

==== Stun-lethal fence ====
A stun-lethal electric fence can be set to deliver a non-fatal shock if touched once, and a fatal one if touched a second time.

Twelve-foot-high stun-lethal fences have been in use for some time in many U.S. state prisons, such as those in Arizona. The Federal Bureau of Prisons added them in 2005 to two prisons in Coleman, Florida, and to prisons in Tucson; Terre Haute, Indiana; Hazelton, West Virginia; Pine Knot, Kentucky; and Pollock, Louisiana.

A stun-lethal fence may also consist of two fences: one set of wires forming a conventional pulsed DC non-lethal fence, and the second set (interleaved with the first) forming a 6.6 kV AC lethal fence, energized when the DC fence detects an intruder. Alternatively, it may consist of a single AC or pulsed DC fence capable of running in "safe", "unsafe", or "lethal" modes by varying the DC pulse energy, AC/DC fence voltage, or fence on-off duty cycle.

==== Lethal fence ====
Electric fences designed to carry potentially lethal currents can be used for anti-personnel purposes.

In 1915, during World War I, the German occupiers of Belgium closed off the border with neutral Netherlands, using a 300 km electric fence running from Vaals to the Scheldt. Germany also erected a similar fence to isolate thirteen Alsatian villages from Switzerland.

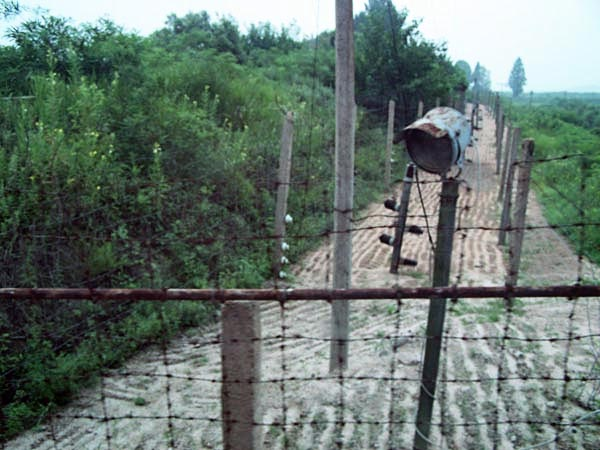
Electric fences are used in the DMZ, which separates North Korea from South Korea.

Electric fences were used to guard the concentration camps of Nazi Germany during World War II, where potentially lethal voltages and currents were employed, continuously rather than in pulses. Some prisoners used the electric barbed-wire fence to kill themselves. Many died at Mauthausen by being thrown onto the high-voltage wire. One was Georg Benjamin, physician and anti-National Socialist activist, brother to scholar Walter Benjamin. Georg Benjamin's transfer to the Mauthausen concentration camp was tantamount to a death sentence. The Gestapo's transport order expressly stated that a return of the communist and Jew was undesirable. The camp's death list states the cause of death as "suicide due to high voltage". Similarly, the message from the command of the Mauthausen concentration camp to the widow speaks of “suicide by touching the power line,” while the death certificate only mentions that “Doctor Israel Georg Benjamin” died on August 26, 1942 at 1:30 a.m. Hilde Spiel, on the other hand, writes in her autobiography that Benjamin was killed. Benjamin's grave is in the Wilmersdorfer Waldfriedhof Stahnsdorf in field B IW II-6. A former Nazi prisoner testified to the American Military Tribunal in Dachau, Germany on August 13, 1947 that Jews were forced to jump into electrically charged fences to be burned to death. The witness, who preferred to remain unidentified because of fear of reprisals, testified that he saw Franz Koffler, one of the accused, beat five Jews and order them to jump into the wired fences. Two of the Jews accepted their fate and were immediately electrocuted, but the other three, a father and two sons, held back. The father begged that his life be sacrificed but his sons’ spared, but Koffler and several other guards picked up the three and tossed them to their deaths.

During the Algerian War the French erected the electrified Morice Line.

Sections of the inner German border were lined with a 3 m (10 ft) high electric fence to deter potential defectors from East Germany. Similarly, the Czechoslovak border was lined with high electric fence during Cold War to prevent emigration from Czechoslovakia.

Electric fences are used in similar fashion at some high-security prisons and certain other installations. Typically a nonelectric fence is constructed on either side of such an installation, or the deadly current is carried out of casual reach atop a wall.

North Korea uses electric fences to seal off parts of its border with South Korea and China.

=== Other uses ===
Buried electric fences (also called "invisible fences" or "electronic fences") are sometimes used to contain dogs or livestock. The buried wire radiates a weak radio signal, which is detected by a collar worn by the animal. The collar emits a warning noise near the wire, but if this is ignored, produces a mild shock. Humans and other animals are unaware of the buried line. In a similar system, the collar uses GPS signals to determine proximity to a predetermined "virtual fence" without a physical installation.

== Interference and unwanted effects ==
Poorly-designed or badly-maintained electric fences can produce sufficient electromagnetic interference to cause problems for nearby telephone, radio, and television reception. This interference has affected dial-up Internet users in some rural areas.

== See also ==
- Agricultural fencing
- Temporary fencing
