= Special purpose private equity fund =

A special purpose private equity fund (SPPEF) also called a special purpose private equity investment fund, is a legal entity, frequently a Limited Liability Company incorporated in the US state of Delaware, but it can be any type of corporation or partnership entity and of any domicile, including sovereign states. It is formed so as to enable a group of investors, usually individuals, to invest collectively in another entity. It is mostly used to enable private investors in early-stage technology companies to pool their resources and invest on the same terms that a traditional venture capital fund would. Such investors are typically referred to as angel investors.

For angel investors investing in technology companies that are involved in sectors that they have been successful in offers an opportunity to make informed bets and to leverage their networks and experience as advisers so as to leverage their intellectual capital as well as their financial capital. However they often face scope and scale issues. Many are limited to relatively small investment amounts, often in the $50K–$250K range. That therefore usually requires investing in very early-stage companies so as to have a relevant investment. They often struggle to maintain their pro-rata investment through subsequent venture capital rounds. Others with more capital to invest fare better but still lack significant leverage. Only the "super angels" can truly leverage their investment and they often lack the time to manage the investment effectively.

One solution for angels is to belong to angel investment groups. These tend to be most effective in California. However, there is often a good process for investment presentation, due diligence and placement but not for ongoing management. A key feature of a SPPEF is that it has an external, professional manager.

The SPPEF model was originally created by Gramercy Private Equity, however, many organizations including angel groups offer SPPEFs.
