= Pet fence =

Aversive stimuli-based containment system

A pet fence or radio fence, is an electronic system designed to keep a pet or other domestic animal within a set of predefined boundaries without the use of a physical barrier. A mild electric shock is delivered by an electronic collar if its warning sound is ignored. The system was first invented and patented by Richard Peck in 1973.

== History ==
The pet fence was created in 1973 by Richard Peck. Peck was a traveling salesman and through his travels, he saw enough dogs hit by cars that it led to him creating the pet fence system. In 1976, salesman John Purtell bought the rights to the pet fence and rebranded it as "Invisible Fence" which offered a different option for pet owners in terms of pet containment. In 1990, Invisible Fence Co became Invisible Fence Inc.

== Technology ==
A typical invisible fence transmits a radio signal that takes the geometric shape of the area that is enclosed by the system. The pet wears a lightweight collar that emits a sensory cue, such as a warning sound, when the pet nears the boundary. If the warning is ignored and the pet crosses beyond the boundary of the fence, the pet receives an additional signal, such as a mild electric shock, or a combination of signals that causes the animal to adapt its behavior and remain within the boundary. Only animals that wear equipment that captures the system's signals are affected by the defined boundaries of the system.

Although called "fences", these fence less boundary systems are more accurately termed electronic pet containment systems. Similar containment systems may be used to contain livestock in circumstances where ordinary agricultural fencing is not convenient or legal, such as on British common land.

=== Variants ===
An underground fence is an electronic system to prevent pets from leaving a yard. A buried wire around the containment area emits a radio signal to activate the receiver collar. A shock collar on the pet receives these signals. When the pet approaches the buried fence line, the collar makes a warning sound and then gives the pet a harmless electric shock.

Other pet fences are wireless. Rather than using an underground wire, they emit a radio signal from a central unit, and activate when the pet travels beyond a certain radius from the unit.

In another type, the collar uses GPS signals to determine proximity to a predetermined "virtual fence", without the need for any physical installation at all. This system allows some additional flexibility, such as simpler inclusion of "islands" within the containment area, and easier changes to the boundary, although location of the boundary is not as precise due to GPS tolerances.

In addition, some collars have multiple settings, allowing owners to have a collar emit a tone only, or one of several levels of static shock, with higher levels used to contain bigger, stronger dogs.

== Downsides ==
Underground fences cannot exclude other animals from the predetermined boundary. A dog contained within an underground fence can still fall prey to a larger dog or coyote, or even a person looking to harass or steal animals. This type of fencing does not have a warning mechanism to humans who might inadvertently wander inside the perimeter, making them more susceptible to dog bites/attacks. This type of containment is also not maintenance free; this system can only operate if the batteries in the animal's collar are properly working. Finally underground fencing is not effectively accepted by every animal. Some pets become too afraid to wander into their yards out of fear of being shocked. If a pet is afraid to leave the yard it is usually a training issue. In August 2018 the British Government announced that all containment fences should be professionally installed to ensure the safety and security of both cats and dogs.

Electronic fences may not prevent dog bite incidents because children or other persons may still be able to approach dogs or other animals that are confined by such a fence, and the fence may cause the behavior of a confined animal to appear better than it actually is. Also, an electronic fence becomes ineffective if an animal crosses a boundary while in a state of excitement.

== Upsides ==
Underground fences can be used on terrains or properties where it is not possible to traditionally fence. Modern systems are also suitable for cats and each year hundreds of thousands of cats go missing and are either killed or injured on the road. The underground fence can be used to secure driveways and open areas. Since the innovation of new training protocols for cats, the underground fence has become a viable option for cat owners as well.

A 2016 University of Lincoln study that looked at the use of cat containment using electronic fences found "no evidence of long-term welfare problems with electronic containment of cats".

== See also ==
- Electric fence
- Shock collar
