= Private equity fund =

Type of investment fund

A private equity fund (PE fund) is a collective investment scheme used for making investments in various equity (and to a lesser extent debt) securities according to one of the investment strategies associated with private equity. Private equity funds are typically limited partnerships with a fixed term of 10 years (often with one- or two-year extensions). At inception, institutional investors make an unfunded commitment to the limited partnership, which is then drawn over the term of the fund. From the investors' point of view, funds can be traditional (where all the investors invest with equal terms) or asymmetric (where different investors have different terms).

A private equity fund is raised and managed by investment professionals of a specific private-equity firm (the general partner and investment advisor). Typically, a single private-equity firm will manage a series of distinct private-equity funds and will attempt to raise a new fund every 3 to 5 years as the previous fund is fully invested.

== Legal structure and terms ==
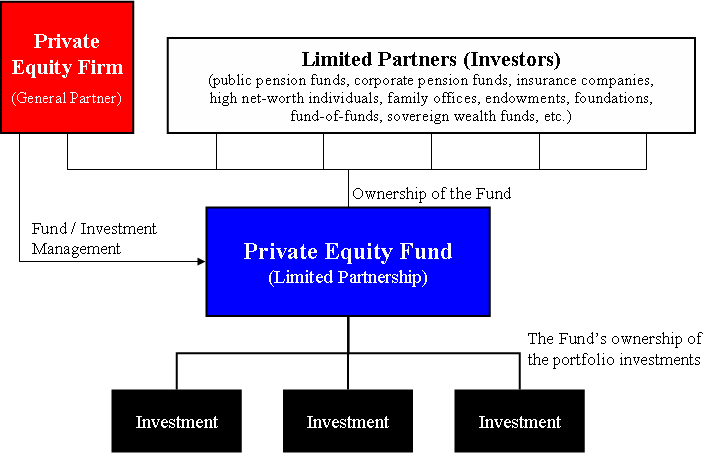
Diagram of the structure of a generic private-equity fund

Most private-equity funds are structured as limited partnerships and are governed by the terms set forth in the limited partnership agreement (LPA). Such funds have a general partner, which raises capital from cash-rich institutional investors, such as pension plans, universities, insurance companies, foundations, endowments, and high-net-worth individuals, which invest as limited partners (LPs) in the fund. Among the terms set forth in the limited partnership agreement are the following:

Term of the partnership
The partnership is usually a fixed-life investment vehicle that is typically 10 years plus some number of extensions.
Management fees
An annual payment made by the investors in the fund to the fund's manager to pay for the private-equity firm's investment operations (typically 1 to 2% of the committed capital of the fund).
Distribution waterfall
The process by which the returned capital will be distributed to the investor, and allocated between limited and general partner. This waterfall includes the preferred return: a minimum rate of return (e.g. 8%) which must be achieved before the general partner can receive any carried interest, and the carried interest, the share of the profits paid the general partner above the preferred return (e.g. 20%).
Transfer of an interest in the fund
Private equity funds are not intended to be transferred or traded; however, they can be transferred to another investor. Typically, such a transfer must receive the consent of and is at the discretion of the fund's manager.
Restrictions on the general partner
The fund's manager has significant discretion to make investments and control the affairs of the fund. However, the LPA does have certain restrictions and controls and is often limited in the type, size, or geographic focus of investments permitted, and how long the manager is permitted to make new investments.

The following is an illustration of the difference between a private-equity fund and a private-equity firm:

Private equity firm	Private equity fund	Private equity portfolio investments (partial list)
Kohlberg Kravis Roberts & Co. (KKR)	KKR 2006 Fund, L.P. ($17.6 billion of commitments)	Alliance Boots
Kohlberg Kravis Roberts & Co. (KKR)	KKR 2006 Fund, L.P. ($17.6 billion of commitments)	Dollar General
Kohlberg Kravis Roberts & Co. (KKR)	KKR 2006 Fund, L.P. ($17.6 billion of commitments)	Energy Future Holdings Corporation
Kohlberg Kravis Roberts & Co. (KKR)	KKR 2006 Fund, L.P. ($17.6 billion of commitments)	First Data Corp
Kohlberg Kravis Roberts & Co. (KKR)	KKR 2006 Fund, L.P. ($17.6 billion of commitments)	Hospital Corporation of America
Kohlberg Kravis Roberts & Co. (KKR)	KKR 2006 Fund, L.P. ($17.6 billion of commitments)	Nielsen Company
Kohlberg Kravis Roberts & Co. (KKR)	KKR 2006 Fund, L.P. ($17.6 billion of commitments)	NXP Semiconductors

== Investments and financing ==
A private-equity fund typically makes investments in companies (known as portfolio companies). These portfolio company investments are funded with the capital raised from LPs, and may be partially or substantially financed by debt. Some private equity investment transactions can be highly leveraged with debt financing—hence the acronym LBO for "leveraged buy-out". The cash flow from the portfolio company usually provides the source for the repayment of such debt. While billion dollar private equity investments make the headlines, private-equity funds also play a large role in middle market businesses.

Such LBO financing most often comes from commercial banks, although other financial institutions, such as hedge funds and mezzanine funds, may also provide financing. Since mid-2007, debt financing has become much more difficult to obtain for private-equity funds than in previous years.

LBO funds commonly acquire most of the equity interests or assets of the portfolio company through a newly created special purpose acquisition subsidiary controlled by the fund, and sometimes as a consortium of several like-minded funds.

=== Multiples and prices ===
The acquisition price of a portfolio company is usually based on a multiple of the company's historical income, most often based on the measure of earnings before interest, taxes, depreciation, and amortization. Private equity multiples are highly dependent on the portfolio company's industry, the size of the company, and the availability of LBO financing.

=== Portfolio company sales (exits) ===
A private-equity fund's ultimate goal is to sell or exit its investments in portfolio companies for a return, known as internal rate of return (IRR) in excess of the price paid. These exit scenarios historically have been an initial public offering of the portfolio company or a sale of the company to a strategic acquirer through a merger or acquisition, also known as a trade sale. A sale of the portfolio company to another private-equity firm, also known as a secondary, has become a common feature of developed private equity markets.

In prior years, another exit strategy has been a preferred dividend by the portfolio company to the private-equity fund to repay the capital investment, sometimes financed with additional debt.

== Investment features and considerations ==
Considerations for investing in private-equity funds relative to other forms of investment include:

Substantial entry requirements
With most private-equity funds requiring significant initial commitment (usually upwards of $1,000,000), which can be drawn at the manager's discretion over the first few years of the fund.
Limited liquidity
Investments in limited partnership interests (the dominant legal form of private equity investments) are referred to as illiquid investments, which should earn a premium over traditional securities, such as stocks and bonds. Once invested, liquidity of invested funds may be very difficult to achieve before the manager realizes the investments in the portfolio because an investor's capital may be locked-up in long-term investments for as long as twelve years. Distributions may be made only as investments are converted to cash with limited partners typically having no right to demand that sales be made.
Investment control
Nearly all investors in private equity are passive and rely on the manager to make investments and generate liquidity from those investments. Typically, governance rights for limited partners in private-equity funds are minimal. However, in some cases, limited partners with substantial investment enjoy special rights and terms of investment.
Unfunded commitments
An investor's commitment to a private-equity fund is satisfied over time as the general partner makes capital calls on the investor. If a private-equity firm cannot find suitable investment opportunities, it will not draw on an investor's commitment, and an investor may potentially invest less than expected or committed.
Investment risks
Given the risks associated with private equity investments, an investor can lose all of its investment. The risk of loss of capital is typically higher in venture capital funds, which invest in companies during the earliest phases of their development or in companies with high amounts of financial leverage. By their nature, investments in privately held companies tend to be riskier than investments in publicly traded companies.
High returns
Consistent with the risks outlined above, private equity can provide high returns, with the best private equity managers significantly outperforming the public markets.

For the above-mentioned reasons, private-equity fund investment is for investors who can afford to have capital locked up for long periods and who can risk losing significant amounts of money. These disadvantages are offset by the potential benefits of annual returns, which may range up to 30% per annum for successful funds.

== See also ==
- Distribution waterfall
- History of private equity and venture capital
- List of private equity firms
- Private equity
- Real estate fund
- Special purpose private equity fund
- Taxation of private equity and hedge funds
