= Asymmetric fund =

Venture capital fund

Asymmetric fund is a venture capital fund where different investors have different terms. Typically the asymmetry is seen in cases where there's an investor that has other interests in addition to straight profit generation through the investment, such as tax income in case of public investors.

Asymmetric model has its roots in Israel. Asymmetry was used to initiate the venture capital business there. Part of the success of Israeli venture backed technology business is attributed this asymmetric model. More recently asymmetric model has been raising phenomena especially in some European countries. There are asymmetric funds operating at least in Finland, Great Britain, the Netherlands and Poland.

== See also ==
- Corporate venture capital
- Venture capital financing
- List of venture capital firms
- Private equity
- Seed funding
