= Invisible Fence Inc. =

Fencing company

- Company type: Corporation
- Industry: Retail, Consumer Electronics
- Founded: August 1973; 52 years ago
- Headquarters: Knoxville, Tennessee, U.S.
- Area served: United States; Canada
- Key people: Willie Wallace (Chief Executive Officer), Randy Boyd (Executive Chairman)
- Services: Pet Containment
- Number of employees: 700+
- Parent: Radio Systems Corp.
- Website: www.invisiblefence.com

Invisible Fence Inc. (commonly referred to as Invisible Fence Brand) is a company that designs radio pet fences for cats and dogs. Manufactured and distributed by Radio System Corporation, the company sells wireless and fenceless systems that were first introduced in 1973. Its best-known product consists of an underground wire and a collar with an integrated transmitter that provides a signal to the pet when it approaches the perimeter.

== History ==
In the 1970s, traveling salesman Richard Peck worked as a sales and product manager for companies in Pennsylvania. His work took him from city to city, and as he drove through these towns, he noticed the number of dead pets lying along highways and city streets. He developed the idea of an "Invisible Fence".

In 1973, he received a patent for the concept to build the first invisible fence. Peck formed a company called Stay-Put Sales Co. and marketed his product mainly through direct mail and magazines. In 1976, Peck sold the marketing and patent rights to John Purtell. Purtell created a company named Invisible Fence Co.

In the 1980s, the receiver the dog wore around its neck was around the size of a cigarette packet. It suited larger dogs like Labradors and Huskies but not smaller animals like Chihuahuas without choking them. The product's range also only allowed a maximum of three acres of circle wire. Putrell pulled it from the market while the product was redeveloped to be smaller and needed a new battery only twice a year.

Invisible Fence Co. lost exclusive rights to Peck's invention when the patent expired in 1990. As a result, many other companies emerged and designed their own version of the product including Radio System Corp, which currently owns the company.

In 1993, John Purtell sold his interest in Invisible Fence.

In 2001, IFCO and the Invisible Fence Brand were sold to Kohlberg & Company. Kohlberg and Company sold the company to Radio Systems Corp in 2006.

== Project Breathe ==
Its Project Breathe is an initiative created by the Invisible Fence Brand. The program donates animal oxygen mask kits to fire departments and first responders.

== Notable products ==
Products
Boundary Plus
GPS 2.0 Wire Free Pet Fence
The Doorman
Shields and Micro Shields
