= Airwallex =

Financial services company

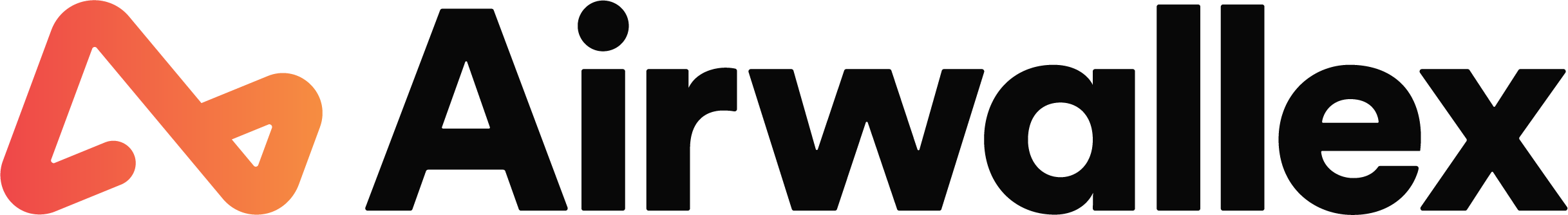
- Type: Private
- Industry: Financial services, technology, fintech
- Founded: 2015; 11 years ago in Melbourne, Australia
- Founders: Jack Zhang, Max Li, Lucy Liu, Xijing Dai, Ki-lok Wong
- Headquarters: San Francisco and Singapore
- Services: Payment processing, forex, debit cards, banking services, spend management, yield on funds
- Total equity: US$8 billion (2025)
- Number of employees: 2,000 (2026)
- Website: airwallex.com

Airwallex is a financial technology company founded in Melbourne, Australia, in 2015. It provides payment processing, foreign exchange, business accounts, corporate cards, and other financial services to businesses. In 2019, Airwallex reached a reported valuation of US$8 billion.

== History ==
=== Founding and growth ===
Airwallex was created in 2015 in Melbourne, Australia by five co-founders. At the time, software engineer Jack Zhang and architect Max Li had invested in a coffee shop in Melbourne, and were finding cross-border payments for imports to be costly and time-consuming for a small company. Zhang was involved in designing the digital forex trading platforms for the National Australia Bank (NAB) and Australia and New Zealand Banking Group Limited (ANZ). Zhang and Li partnered with Lucy Liu and Xijing Dai, fellow alumni from the University of Melbourne, as well as Ki-Lok Wong. With the founders investing a combined $1 million, roles included Zhang as CEO, Liu as president, Li as head of design, Dai as chief technology officer, and Wong as principal architect.

The Airwallex platform was developed to lower business costs for cross-border payments, and was launched in a closed beta trial stage in 2015. The company built a proprietary network with banks, such as Standard Chartered, DBS Bank and the Industrial and Commercial Bank of China, to handle local transactions. ANZ began providing transactional services to Airwallex in 2017, with both MasterCard's Send platform and Tencent's WeRemit service powered by Airwallex. In 2018, Airwallex moved its headquarters from Melbourne to Hong Kong and turned down a US$1 billion acquisition bid by Stripe. Airwallex closed the "second-largest fundraising round in Australian start-up history" in July 2018, netting $80 million.

=== International expansion and growth ===
In March 2019 raised US$100 million in funding at a reported valuation of US$1 billion, making it one of Australia's technology companies to reach a status commonly known as "unicorn status," as well as Australia's third technology unicorn overall. In 2020, media reports described Airwallex's plans to expand beyond foreign-exchange transfers into a broader range of financial technology services for businesses. In 2020, NAB was providing payroll and rental payment services to Airwallex. The NAB had previously cancelled transactional banking services for Airwallex customers in 2018. In 2021, Hong Kong unfroze $18.2 million in funds and released them to Airwallex after Hong Kong's High Court dismissed suspicions by the Hong Kong Police Organised and Serious Crimes Ordinance that two former Airwallex clients had used Airwallex for money laundering.

In May 2021, Airwallex received a license in the Netherlands, giving them access to the European market. Airwallex started operations in the US in August, and secured a license in Malaysia in September 2021. In November 2021, Airwallex raised an additional US$100 million, reaching a new valuation of $5.5 billion and bringing the total funds raised since 2015 to $802 million. After debuting a borderless card for businesses in Australia in 2020, Airwallex released a version of that debit card with Visa in Hong Kong in 2021, followed by a release in the U.S. in 2022. Airwallex launched in Singapore in early 2022. Later that year, in October 2022, Airwallex raised another US$100 million, and in October 2022, CRN valued it at US$5.6 billion.

In March 2023, Airwallex secured a third-party payment license in China through the acquisition of Guangzhou Shangwutong Network Technology, becoming only the second foreign company to have secured the license after PayPal. In October 2023, Airwallex acquired a Mexico-based payments company, MexPago, and continued its overall expansion in Singapore, Malaysia, Australia, the United Kingdom, the United States, the European Union, Hong Kong, Israel, and Canada. In February 2024, Airwallex signed a multi-year partnership with the McLaren Formula 1 racing team, with the Airwallex logo added to McLaren's livery. In September 2023, Airwallex launched a program in Hong Kong to provide grants to local startups, with the program subsequently expanded to Australia and Singapore. By that summer 1,200 startups in Australia were part of the Airwallex for Startups program. In June 2024, Airwallex expanded into France, and in August 2024, Airwallex announced an annual revenue run rate of $500 million and that it was preparing to be IPO-ready 2026.

Airwallex entered the New Zealand market in March 2025, and also agreed to acquire Vietnamese intermediary payment service (IPS) CTIN Pay. The company was then reported as having exceeded US$130 billion in its annual transaction volume. That month, it reported $720 million in annualized revenue, a 90% increase from the year prior. In May 2025, Airwallex raised $300 million in a Series F funding round, which increased its valuation to US$6.2 billion with investment from Visa Ventures, Blackbird Ventures, and Airtree. In July 2025, Airwallex became the official finance software partner of Arsenal Football Club. Airwallex in 2025 had over 25 offices and 1,800 employees.

In October 2025, Airwallex reported annual revenue of US$1 billion, and annual transaction volumes of US$235 billion. Airwallex was registered in Japan in November 2025. In December 2025, Airwallex acquired PT Skye Sab, expanding its infrastructure into Indonesia. Also in December 2025, Airwallex raised $330 million in a funding round led by Addition, with other investors such as T. Rowe Price Associates, Activant, Robinhood Ventures and TIAA Ventures. The round valued Airwallex at $8 billion. By the end of 2025, Airwallex held 80 licenses and permits, with its consumer services accessible in around 200 countries.

=== Recent developments ===
In December 2025, Airwallex was accused of handing sensitive American user data to Chinese government officials that "create legal obligations to assist with CCP espionage upon request". Internal messages by Airwallex executives from 2023 found that increased access to information was not requested by the Australian commercial team with the presumption being it was driven by China. In response, Airwallex diluted its major Chinese shareholder and added a United States headquarters as part of an $8 billion funding round. United States Senator Tom Cotton requested via a letter to Attorney General Pam Bondi that Airwallex be investigated for giving access of its data to the Chinese Communist Party that same month. In May 2026, Airwallex moved an estimated 100 staffers out of China amidst the scrutiny.

Cotton later sent a letter to United States Secretary of the Treasury Scott Bessent to investigate Airwallex for its ties to China. U.S. Representative John Moolenaar, chairman of the House Select Committee on China, also sent a letter to Bessent due to its "deep ties to PRC-jurisdiction entities handling sensitive U.S. financial data for companies in critical sectors."

In January 2026, it was announced that Airwallex had acquired the South Korean fintech company Paynuri, marking its entry into the South Korean market. The acquisition provided Airwallex with local payment gateway, prepaid electronic payment instrument and foreign exchange business licences, enabling the launch of its services in the country. That same month, the Australian Transaction Reports and Analysis Centre (AUSTRAC) ordered an audit of Airwallex for suspected anti-money laundering and counter-terrorism financing compliance issues. In February 2026, Airwallex announced an expansion into Germany, and a new office in Berlin.

== Products and services ==
Airwallex states its financial platform for businesses has features related to online payments, spend management, embedded finance, and global business accounts. It uses a proprietary banking network to handle local transactions, with machine learning in its SaaS products. In late 2023, Airwallex began using generative AI for its know your customer (KYC) and customer onboarding process. Airwallex said the tool increased the efficiency of its customer onboarding process.

Beyond forex services, other services include online payments acceptance, bank accounts, borderless cards, and a suite of application programming interfaces (APIs). According to the company, as of 2026 its technology was used by around 200,000 businesses.

=== Airwallex Yield ===
In November 2023, Airwallex launched the investment product Airwallex Yield in Australia. Yield allowed wholesale businesses to earn returns on their AUD and USD balances without opening a foreign bank account, then a unique product in Australia. It became available to a broader market in July 2024, when the Australian Securities and Investment Commission (ASIC) granted Airwallex an Australian Financial Services License for retail investment products. By that point, Airwallex had A$100 million in funds under management.

Airwallex Yield launched in Hong Kong in June 2025, Singapore in July 2025, and the Netherlands in August 2025.
