= Next (2007 film) =

2007 film

- Theatrical release poster
- Directed by: Lee Tamahori
- Screenplay by: Gary Goldman; Jonathan Hensleigh; Paul Bernbaum
- Based on: "The Golden Man" by Philip K. Dick
- Produced by: Nicolas Cage; Todd Garner; Norm Golightly; Graham King; Arne Schmidt
- Starring: Nicolas Cage; Julianne Moore; Jessica Biel; Thomas Kretschmann; Tory Kittles; Peter Falk
- Cinematography: David Tattersall
- Edited by: Christian Wagner
- Music by: Mark Isham
- Production companies: Revolution Studios; Initial Entertainment Group; Virtual Studios; Saturn Films
- Distributed by: Paramount Pictures (Note: While Paramount Pictures was responsible for releasing the film in North and Latin America, Australia, New Zealand, Germany, Austria and South Korea, distribution in other territories was managed by Initial Entertainment Group.)
- Release date: April 27, 2007
- Running time: 96 minutes
- Country: United States
- Language: English
- Budget: $78.1 million
- Box office: $77.6 million

Next is a 2007 American science fiction action thriller film directed by Lee Tamahori and starring Nicolas Cage, Julianne Moore, Jessica Biel, Thomas Kretschmann, Tory Kittles, and Peter Falk. The film's original script was loosely based on the 1954 science fiction short story "The Golden Man" by Philip K. Dick. The film tells the story of Cris Johnson, a small-time magician based in Las Vegas, who has limited precognition. His ability allows him to see into the very immediate future. His gift not only makes him a target of a highly motivated and heavily armed group of terrorists, but also puts him in the crosshairs of the FBI who want to recruit him to oppose those terrorists instead.

The film was released on April 27, 2007, in the United States by Paramount Pictures. With a production budget of $78.1 million, the film grossed $77.6 million worldwide, making it a box office flop.

It was the first Revolution Studios film to be distributed by Paramount Pictures, followed by 2017's XXX: Return of Xander Cage.

== Plot ==
A man named Cris Johnson can see into his future. He can only see two minutes ahead, with the exception of a vision he once had of a woman walking into a diner. Knowing no details other than the time, he goes to the diner twice each day at 8:09 to await her arrival. He works as a small-time magician in Las Vegas, where he supplements his income with gambling, using his powers to win medium amounts against the house.

Cris draws the attention of FBI Agent Callie Ferris, who has figured out his ability and wants to stop French terrorists from detonating a nuclear weapon. Before she can approach Cris, his gambling draws the attention of casino security. He stops a shooting and takes down the would-be shooter in the casino. Then, using his ability to forecast the actions of his pursuers, he eludes them and the Las Vegas police. Ferris tracks Cris to his location, but he escapes after foreseeing her arrival. Later that night, the casino's security chief is approached by two of the terrorists and interrogated about Johnson before being killed.

The following morning, Cris is at the diner again when he sees Liz Cooper, the woman from his vision. It turns out that Cris can not only see the future, but also see how his actions can affect that future. When Liz's aggressive ex-boyfriend arrives, Johnson envisions all outcomes of his intervening, and then chooses the outcome that gets him "in" with Liz. Knowing that she is heading for Flagstaff, Arizona, Cris tricks her into giving him a ride. Ferris follows, while the terrorists decide to kill him. With the weapon tracked to Los Angeles, Ferris persuades her superiors to let her bring Cris in. The terrorists follow in the hope that the agents will lead them to Cris.

Cris and Liz have to spend the night in a motel. Ferris confronts Liz near the hotel. Claiming Cris is a dangerous sociopath, Ferris asks Liz to drug Cris so that they can bring him in peacefully. Instead, Liz warns Cris, who tells her his secret. When she asks why he will not help the FBI stop the terrorists, he explains his limitations, noting the exception for events involving her. Cris tries to escape from the FBI but is captured after saving Ferris from logs tumbling down the side of a mountain. Unable to get to Cris, the terrorists kidnap Liz.

The FBI strap Cris to a chair and force him to watch television until he has a vision that can help. They expect him to see a report about the detonation of the bomb, but instead he envisions a broadcast from several hours in the future in which Liz is killed with a bomb vest while strapped to a wheelchair as bait for him. Cris escapes and races to the parking garage where she will be killed. Catching up to him, Ferris promises to help save Liz as long as Cris will help stop the bomb; she also sets up a plan to draw out the terrorists.

Cris helps the FBI track the terrorists to the port where they are based. When they arrive, Cris is able to walk right up to the terrorist leader while using his power to dodge bullets. After killing the terrorists and saving Liz, they find that the bomb has already been moved. Ferris shows Cris a seismograph, hoping that he will see any tremors caused by explosions before they happen. As he stares at the screen he realizes that he has made a mistake and that he was too late: the bomb detonates out at sea and completely destroys the port, as well as the rest of the city.

The timeline reverts a full day to Cris and Liz in bed at the hotel in Arizona, before Ferris arrived. Because of Liz's involvement in events, Cris has now been able to envision everything that could happen leading to the nuclear explosion. "Every time you look into the future, it changes."

Cris calls Ferris and offers to help prevent the nuclear disaster, then asks Liz to wait for him.

== Cast ==
- Nicolas Cage as Cris Johnson / Frank Cadillac, The Magician
- Julianne Moore as FBI Agent Callie Ferris
- Jessica Biel as Elizabeth Cooper
- Thomas Kretschmann as Mr. Smith
- Tory Kittles as FBI Agent Cavanaugh
- Peter Falk as Irv
- Jim Beaver as FBI Director Wisdom
- Enzo Cilenti as Mr. Jones
- Jason Butler Harner as Jeff Baines
- Jose Zuniga as Security Chief Roybal
- Sergej Trifunović as Mr. White
- Jack Ong as Man from Korea
- Jessica Barth as Pretty Blonde
- Bonita Friedericy as Cashier Girl
- Paul Rae as Road Crew Foreman
- Michael Trucco as Kendall

== Production ==
Gary Goldman and Jason Koornick initially optioned the science fiction short story "The Golden Man" by Philip K. Dick. Goldman wrote a script treatment that he and Koornick presented to Nicolas Cage's production company, Saturn Films, but Goldman ended up writing the screenplay on spec.

=== Original draft ===
This first draft had more similarities to the short story, detailing the efforts of a government agency to capture and contain a precognitive mutant.

To provide greater interaction between the opposing parties (as well as create a leading role), Cris was changed from a feral animal whose existence threatened humanity's into a more familiar and understandable social outcast. A romantic subplot was added: the character of Liz Cooper, who in this draft was not only destined to be the love of Cris's life, but a mutant as well (born in Love Canal) and the only woman he has ever met with whom he can have children, herself incapable of procreating with normal humans.

As the original short story had a distinct tone of racist paranoia, the motivation for the pursuit of Cris was changed from an ironclad policy of exterminating mutations to a manipulative Department of Homeland Security (DHS) agent's obsessive search for unconventional assets in the war on terror.

This script was filled with anti-authoritarian themes, with Cris often speaking of how he enjoys his independence. He states plainly that "what I want is freedom. And you don't get it by giving it up."

The DHS is explicitly depicted as a completely unregulated, powerful and unapologetically ruthless collection of fanatics, breaking laws without consideration and eager to torture and even murder innocent civilians to achieve their objectives. They discuss their plans in using Cris as if he were a piece of machinery, most of which consist of using him as a "timescope": that is, bolting him into a chair for the rest of his life so his only experiences are ones which are useful to them, a process which they believe would extend the range of his abilities. One agent suggests that they amputate his arms and legs, a suggestion his colleague considers humorous.

However, his enemies are skilled tormentors and eventually they drive him to the breaking point: when the DHS learns that Liz is pregnant with his child, they decide to have her executed at a pre-determined time, thus pre-emptively proving to Cris their determination to possess him. He attempts to secure Liz's safety, but the DHS captures her. In retaliation, he demolishes the Las Vegas DHS headquarters with a barrel of C-4 explosive agents had seized earlier in a warrant-less search. He and Liz are the only survivors.

=== Saturn re-draft ===
Saturn Films had the script extensively rewritten and in the process almost eliminated its anti-authoritarian themes. Though Cris remained a meek social outcast, he is somewhat less sympathetic: he is portrayed as arrogant, as well as far more prone to applying violent solutions. The DHS's role was replaced with the Federal Bureau of Investigation (FBI). Despite a scene in which Cris experiences his worst nightmare – spending the rest of his life strapped into a chair with his eyes wedged open – the authorities are portrayed as sympathetic and Cris as uncooperative and belligerent. Their insistence on his obedience is reduced to the point that the authorities offer their assistance in rescuing Liz (whom they neglect to arrest despite her efforts to sabotage Cris's capture) from the terrorists. This leads to the film's greatest variation from the original draft – a confrontation with the terrorists. No clue is given as to the motivation for the terrorists' detonation of the nuclear device in Los Angeles. The few terrorists who speak in the film with British, French and German accents, seem to be under the guidance of an unseen leader who has told them that they must kill Cris since "he says that Cris is the only threat to the plan". During the confrontation with the terrorists, Cris willingly supports the FBI with his abilities in a series of sequences similar to those in the original script, only with the authorities as allies instead of antagonists.

This was the script Saturn Films brought to the attention of Revolution Studios. Revolution Studios acquired the screenplay and in November 2004, Revolution Studios hired Lee Tamahori to direct the film, with Cage in the lead role. Filming was to begin in summer 2005. In December 2005, Julianne Moore was cast as the federal agent who seeks people to help prevent future terrorism and uncovers Cage's character as a potential candidate. In November 2005, Initial Entertainment Group negotiated for rights of international distribution of Next, which had a target release date of 2007. In February 2006, actress Jessica Biel was cast as the love interest of Cage's character.

In May 2006, Starz! Entertainment's 14-episode reality television miniseries, Looking for Stars, gave 200 contestants the opportunity to earn a speaking role in Next, which was won by actor Marcus Welch.

=== Filming ===
Sections of the film were filmed in the San Bernardino Mountains in California. Mountain locations used in production of the film included Crestline, Running Springs and Big Bear Lake. The hotel featured in the film, "The Cliffhanger", is actually a restaurant overlooking the City of San Bernardino. In order to make the restaurant look more like a hotel, a facade was attached to the building. The facade is the section of the motel where Johnson and Liz Cooper were staying. Interior shots were filmed elsewhere. Following the end of production, the facade was removed. However, remnants of the signage placed and the paint works conducted remain intact. Running Springs served for scenes shot in the town. Scenes (in which a vehicle was rolled off the side of a cliff) shot in Big Bear Lake were shot at a campground. Due to the terrain located on the side of the cliff the Cliffhanger is located on, the producers decided to finish the scenes at the campground in Big Bear Lake.

Next originally was to be distributed by Sony Pictures Entertainment (which had a deal with Revolution Studios), set to be released on September 28, 2006, but Sony dumped it in January 2007, and Paramount Pictures subsequently picked it up and released the film on April 27, 2007.

== Reception ==
=== Box office ===
The film opened at #3 at the U.S. box office, grossing $7.1 million in 2,725 theaters in its opening weekend. In its eight-week run in the United States, it grossed a total of just $18 million and has a combined worldwide gross of $76 million. Compared to other films based on Philip K. Dick stories, Next grossed less than Minority Report, Total Recall, Paycheck and Blade Runner but performed better than Impostor, Screamers and A Scanner Darkly.

=== Critical response ===
On the review aggregator website Rotten Tomatoes, 28% of 128 critics' reviews are positive, with an average rating of 4.7/10. The website's consensus reads: "Numerous plot holes and poorly motivated characters prevent Next from being the thought-provoking sci-fi flick it could've been." Metacritic, which uses a weighted average, assigned the film a score of 42 out of 100, based on 23 critics, indicating "mixed or average" reviews. Audiences polled by CinemaScore gave the film an average grade of "B-" on an A+ to F scale.

Justin Chang of Variety said the film plays "like the cinematic equivalent of a Choose Your Own Adventure novel" and that the plot is highly reminiscent of 24. Chang also said "What starts out as a mildly diverting thriller blows itself to smithereens in the final reel", describing the climax as a "stunning cheat." James Berardinelli of ReelViews gave the film 2½ out of 4 stars and said parts of the film are "fascinating" and "compelling" but that "the whole thing ends up collapsing under its own weight." Berardinelli said Nicolas Cage "seems to be going through the motions", "Julianne Moore brings intensity to the part of Callie, although the character is incomplete", "Jessica Biel is appealing" but "the character is unfinished", and that "Thomas Kretschmann is unimpressive as a generic 24-style terrorist." He also said "some viewers will feel cheated by what Next does, and it's hard to blame them." Connie Ogle of the Miami Herald gave the film 2 out of 4 stars and said the film looks like director Lee Tamahori "spent about 12 bucks on his special effects budget." Ogle said the film had a decent premise but "Next begins to seriously embarrass itself and its stars once it rolls to its climax." Toronto Star film critic Peter Howell gave the film 1½ stars out of 4 and called it a "colossal waste of time" and said it is "possibly the most egregious befouling of Dick's work to date." Howell said the roles "seem to be cut-and-pasted from other movies", called the film a "straight-to-DVD wannabe", and said the film "has one of the most infuriating endings ever."

Moira MacDonald of the Seattle Times gave Next 1½ stars out of 4 and said "Late in the movie, Cris shouts at a bad guy, 'I've seen every possible ending here. None of them are good for you.' It's as if he's talking to the audience, and alas, he's right." and "Julianne Moore spends most of her screen time in Lee Tamahori's confused sci-fi thriller Next looking royally pissed off, like she got tricked into making the movie on a sucker bet. You can't blame her; this film's audience is likely to look that way as well by the time the end credits roll." Kalamazoo Gazette critic James Sanford gave the film 1½ stars and said "the only visions Next inspires are flashbacks to better films" like Honeymoon in Vegas, Leaving Las Vegas, The Illusionist, and Hannibal, adding "any film that makes someone wish he or she were watching Hannibal must be pretty awful." Sanford said "Cage performs as if he's on autopilot, Moore looks more miserable than she did as the suicidal housewife in The Hours, and Biel seems fully aware she was hired only to provide a few glimpses of cheesecake." Sanford also remarked, "the ending of this film is not just a colossal cheat, it's a hard slap in the face to anyone who has invested his or her time in watching it." Daniel Eagan of Film Journal International said the film "follows a familiar Hollywood pattern in which a few intriguing ideas are swamped by the demands of a big-budget, star-driven vehicle" and that it "won't add any luster to Nicolas Cage's resume." Eagan said "Half of Next is a clever, unpredictable thriller that plays with Dick's customary obsessions with time and reality. The other half is a sloppy, bloated adventure marred by cheesy special effects and some equally cheesy acting" and also that "the script to Next has plenty of [plot jams], one or two egregious enough to demand ticket refunds."

Orlando Sentinel critic Roger Moore gave the film 3 out of 5 stars and said "who says preposterous junk can't be fun?" Moore said "this sloppy little time travel variation is a crowd-pleasing hoot, thanks mostly to Cage turning on the charisma and showing off his gift for hangdog understatement" and that the Groundhog Day-like attempts to woo Jessica Biel's character are "hilarious." Moore concluded "It's all so stupid and ends so perfunctorily that you can't call Next good, or even as good as the dopey Déjà Vu...but it does score over [Déjà Vu] in one important criterion. It's just fun." Wesley Morris of the Boston Globe gave the film 2½ out of 4 stars and called it a "watchably absurd popcorn flick" and that the film "bears almost no resemblance" to the original short story "The Golden Man", the short story it was adapted from. He described Moore's performance as "enjoyably curt" and said "alongside Cage's spontaneity, Biel seems humorless and earnestly dull." Morris said the film is fun "until it turns crass" and concluded, "when you're being toyed with that cheaply, you forget how much you admire Nicolas Cage's shamelessness and start to resent the movie's." Diana Saenger of ReviewExpress gave the film 3½ stars and said "Next boasts a fresh plot with a tricky twist ending that can be misconstrued if you don't pay close attention and then pause to think about it." Saenger reported that it was Nicolas Cage's idea for Cris to be a magician, and that it was his suggestion that his wife be part of the scene where a woman comes out of the audience to be part of the magic show. Saenger remarked that people complaining about the twist being a rip-off probably didn't understand it and said it made perfect sense and concluded "I liked the surprise twist and found Next very entertaining."

The film was subject to the heckling of Bridget Jones Nelson and Michael J. Nelson in an October 2007 installment of Rifftrax.

== Thematic analysis ==
The technique the protagonist uses to see into the future has been compared to the video game concept of savescumming.

== See also ==
- What You Need (The Twilight Zone). 1959 12 25
- List of adaptations of works by Philip K. Dick
