= Monty Hall problem =

Probability puzzle

In search of a new car, the player chooses a door, say 1. The game host then opens one of the other doors, say 3, to reveal a goat and offers to let the player switch from door 1 to door 2.

The Monty Hall problem is a brain teaser, in the form of a probability puzzle, based nominally on the American television game show Let's Make a Deal and named after its original host, Monty Hall. The problem was originally posed in a letter by Steve Selvin to the American Statistician in 1975. It became famous as a question from reader Craig F. Whitaker's letter quoted in (and solved by) Marilyn vos Savant's "Ask Marilyn" column in Parade magazine in 1990:

Suppose you're on a game show, and you're given the choice of three doors: Behind one door is a car; behind the others, goats. You pick a door, say No. 1, and the host, who knows what's behind the doors, opens another door, say No. 3, which has a goat. He then says to you, "Do you want to pick door No. 2?" Is it to your advantage to switch your choice?

Savant's response was that the contestant should switch to the other door. By the standard assumptions, the switching strategy has a 2/3 probability of winning the car, while the strategy of keeping the initial choice has only a 1/3 probability.

When the player first makes their choice, there is a 2/3 chance that the car is behind one of the doors not chosen. This probability does not change after the host reveals a goat behind one of the unchosen doors. When the host provides information about the two unchosen doors (revealing that one of them does not have the car behind it), the 2/3 chance of the car being behind one of the unchosen doors rests on the unchosen and unrevealed door, as opposed to the 1/3 chance of the car being behind the door the contestant chose initially.

The given probabilities depend on specific assumptions about how the host and contestant choose their doors. An important insight is that, with these standard conditions, there is more information about doors 2 and 3 than was available at the beginning of the game when door 1 was chosen by the player: the host's action adds value to the door not eliminated, but not to the one chosen by the contestant originally. Another insight is that switching doors is a different action from choosing between the two remaining doors at random, as the former action uses the previous information and the latter does not. Other possible behaviors of the host than the one described can reveal different additional information, or none at all, leading to different probabilities. In her response, Savant states:

Suppose there are a million doors, and you pick door #1. Then the host, who knows what's behind the doors and will always avoid the one with the prize, opens them all except door #777,777. You'd switch to that door pretty fast, wouldn't you?

Many readers of Savant's column refused to believe switching is beneficial and rejected her explanation. After the problem appeared in Parade, approximately 10,000 readers, including nearly 1,000 with PhDs, wrote to the magazine, most of them calling Savant wrong. Even when given explanations, simulations, and formal mathematical proofs, many people still did not accept that switching is the best strategy. Paul Erdős, one of the most prolific mathematicians in history, remained unconvinced until he was shown a computer simulation demonstrating Savant's predicted result.

The problem is a paradox of the veridical type, because the solution is so counterintuitive it can seem absurd but is nevertheless demonstrably true. The Monty Hall problem is mathematically related closely to the earlier three prisoners problem and to the much older Bertrand's box paradox.

== Paradox ==
Steve Selvin wrote a letter to the American Statistician in 1975, describing a problem based on the game show Let's Make a Deal, dubbing it the "Monty Hall problem" in a subsequent letter. The problem is equivalent mathematically to the three prisoners problem described in Martin Gardner's "Mathematical Games" column in Scientific American in 1959 and the Three Shells Problem described in Gardner's book Aha Gotcha.

=== Standard assumptions ===
Ambiguities in the Parade version do not explicitly define the protocol of the host. However, Marilyn vos Savant's solution printed alongside Whitaker's question implies, and both Selvin and Savant explicitly define, the role of the host as follows:

1. The host must always open a door that was not selected by the contestant.
2. The host must always open a door to reveal a goat and never the car.
3. The host must always offer the chance to switch between the door chosen originally and the closed door remaining.

It is also presumed that the car is placed (uniformly) at random behind one of the doors and that, if the player initially chooses the car, then the host's choice of which goat-hiding door to open is also made (uniformly) at random.

Under these standard assumptions, the probability of winning the car after switching is 2/3. Varying the assumptions can change the probability of winning by switching doors as detailed in the section below.

These assumptions specify the mathematical model of host behavior and prize distribution being analyzed. In a decision-theoretic reading, whether switching is rational for the contestant also depends on the contestant knowing, or having reason to assume, that the host follows this protocol.

=== Simple solutions ===
Three initial configurations of the game. In two of them, the player wins by switching away from the choice made before a door was opened.

The solution presented by Savant in Parade shows the three possible arrangements of one car and two goats behind three doors and the result of staying or switching after initially picking door 1 in each case:

Behind door 1	Behind door 2	Behind door 3	Result if staying at door #1	Result if switching to the door offered
Goat	Goat	Car	Wins goat	Wins car
Goat	Car	Goat	Wins goat	Wins car
Car	Goat	Goat	Wins car	Wins goat

A player who stays with the initial choice wins in only one out of three of these equally likely possibilities, while a player who switches wins in two out of three.

An intuitive explanation is that, if the contestant initially picks a goat (2 of 3 doors), the contestant will win the car by switching because the other goat can no longer be picked – the host had to reveal its location – whereas if the contestant initially picks the car (1 of 3 doors), the contestant will not win the car by switching. Using the switching strategy, winning or losing thus only depends on whether the contestant has initially chosen a goat (2/3 probability) or the car (1/3 probability). The fact that the host subsequently reveals a goat in one of the unchosen doors changes nothing about the initial probability.

A different selection process, where the player chooses at random after any door has been opened, yields a different probability.

Most people conclude that switching does not matter, because there would be a 50% chance of finding the car behind either of the two unopened doors. This would be true if the host selected a door to open at random, but this is not the case. The host-opened door depends on the player's initial choice, so the assumption of independence does not hold. Before the host opens a door, there is a 1/3 probability that the car is behind each door. If the car is behind door 1, the host can open either door 2 or door 3, so the probability that the car is behind door 1 and the host opens door 3 is $\textstyle \frac{1}{3} \times \frac{1}{2} = \frac{1}{6}.$ If the car is behind door 2 – with the player having picked door 1 – the host must open door 3, such the probability that the car is behind door 2 and the host opens door 3 is $\textstyle \frac{1}{3} \times 1 = \frac{1}{3}.$ These are the only cases where the host opens door 3, so if the player has picked door 1 and the host opens door 3, the car is twice as likely to be behind door 2 as door 1. The key is that if the car is behind door 2 the host must open door 3, but if the car is behind door 1 the host can open either door.

Another way to understand the solution is to consider together the two doors initially unchosen by the player. As Cecil Adams puts it, "Monty is saying in effect: you can keep your one door or you can have the other two doors". The 2/3 chance of finding the car has not been changed by the opening of one of these doors because Monty, knowing the location of the car, is certain to reveal a goat. The player's choice after the host opens a door is no different from if the host offered the player the option to switch from the original chosen door to the set of both remaining doors. The switch in this case clearly gives the player a 2/3 probability of choosing the car.

Car has a 1/3 chance of being behind the player's pick and a 2/3 chance of being behind one of the other two doors.

The host opens a door, the odds for the two sets don't change but the odds become 0 for the open door and 2/3 for the closed door.

As Keith Devlin says, "By opening his door, Monty is saying to the contestant 'There are two doors you did not choose, and the probability that the prize is behind one of them is 2/3. I'll help you by using my knowledge of where the prize is to open one of those two doors to show you that it does not hide the prize. You can now take advantage of this additional information. Your choice of door A has a chance of 1 in 3 of being the winner. I have not changed that. But by eliminating door C, I have shown you that the probability that door B hides the prize is 2 in 3.'"

Savant suggests that the solution will be more intuitive with 1,000,000 doors rather than 3. In this case, there are 999,999 doors with goats behind them and one door with a prize. After the player picks a door, the host opens 999,998 of the remaining doors. On average, in 999,999 times out of 1,000,000, the remaining door will contain the prize. Intuitively, the player should ask how likely it is that, given a million doors, they managed to pick the right one initially. Stibel et al. proposed that working memory demand is taxed during the Monty Hall problem and that this forces people to "collapse" their choices into two equally probable options. They report that when the number of options is increased to more than 7 people tend to switch more often; however, most contestants still incorrectly judge the probability of success to be 50%.

== Savant and the media furor ==
Savant wrote in her first column on the Monty Hall problem that the player should switch. She received thousands of letters from her readers – the vast majority of which, including many from readers with doctorate degrees, disagreed with her answer. During 1990–1991, three more of her columns in Parade were devoted to the paradox. Numerous examples of letters from readers of Savant's columns are presented and discussed in The Monty Hall Dilemma: A Cognitive Illusion Par Excellence.

The discussion was replayed in other venues (e.g., in Cecil Adams's The Straight Dope newspaper column) and reported in major newspapers such as The New York Times.

In an attempt to clarify her answer, she proposed a shell game to illustrate: "You look away, and I put a pea under one of three shells. Then I ask you to put your finger on a shell. The odds that your choice contains a pea are 1/3, agreed? Then I simply lift up an empty shell from the remaining other two. As I can (and will) do this regardless of what you've chosen, we've learned nothing to allow us to revise the odds on the shell under your finger." She also proposed a similar simulation with three playing cards.

Savant commented that, though some confusion was caused by some readers' not realizing they were supposed to assume that the host must always reveal a goat, almost all her numerous correspondents had correctly understood the problem assumptions, and were still initially convinced that Savant's answer ("switch") was wrong.

== Confusion and criticism ==
=== Sources of confusion ===
The three equally likely cases (you pick door 1; the host opens a goat door)

Car is behind	If you stay	If you switch
Door 1	Win	Lose
Door 2	Lose	Win
Door 3	Lose	Win

Staying wins in 1 of 3 cases; switching wins in 2 of 3. An interactive version of this demonstration is available with JavaScript enabled.

When first presented with the Monty Hall problem, an overwhelming majority of people assume that each door has an equal probability and conclude that switching does not matter. Out of 228 subjects in one study, only 13% chose to switch. In vos Savant's book The Power of Logical Thinking, cognitive psychologist Massimo Piattelli-Palmarini writes: "No other statistical puzzle comes so close to fooling all the people all the time [and] even Nobel physicists systematically give the wrong answer, and that they insist on it, and they are ready to berate in print those who propose the right answer". Pigeons repeatedly exposed to the problem rapidly learn to always switch, unlike humans.

Most statements of the problem, notably the one in Parade, do not match the rules of the actual game show and do not fully specify the host's behavior or that the car's location is randomly selected. However, Krauss and Wang argue that people make the standard assumptions even if they are not explicitly stated.

Although these issues are mathematically significant, even when controlling for these factors, nearly all people still think each of the two unopened doors has an equal probability and conclude that switching does not matter. This "equal probability" assumption is a deeply rooted intuition. People strongly tend to think probability is evenly distributed across as many unknowns as are present, whether or not that is true in the particular situation under consideration.

The problem continues to attract the attention of cognitive psychologists. The typical behavior of the majority, i.e., not switching, may be explained by phenomena known in the psychological literature as:

1. The endowment effect, in which people tend to overvalue the winning probability of the door already chosen – already "owned".
2. The status quo bias, in which people prefer to keep the choice of door they have made already.
3. The errors of omission vs. errors of commission effect, in which, all other things being equal, people prefer to make errors by inaction (Stay) as opposed to action (Switch).

Experimental evidence confirms that these are plausible explanations that do not depend on probability intuition. Another possibility is that people's intuition simply does not deal with the textbook version of the problem, but with a real game show setting. There, the possibility exists that the show master plays deceitfully by opening other doors only if a door with the car was initially chosen. A show master playing deceitfully half of the times modifies the winning chances in case one is offered to switch to "equal probability".

=== Criticism of the simple solutions ===
As already remarked, most sources in the topic of probability, including many introductory probability textbooks, solve the problem by showing the conditional probabilities that the car is behind door 1 and door 2 are 1/3 and 2/3 (not 1/2 and 1/2) given that the contestant initially picks door 1 and the host opens door 3; various ways to derive and understand this result were given in the previous subsections.

Among these sources are several that explicitly criticize the popularly presented "simple" solutions, saying these solutions are "correct but ... shaky", or do not "address the problem posed", or are "incomplete", or are "unconvincing and misleading", or are (most bluntly) "false".

Sasha Volokh wrote that "any explanation that says something like 'the probability of door 1 was 1/3, and nothing can change that ...' is automatically fishy: probabilities are expressions of our ignorance about the world, and new information can change the extent of our ignorance."

Some say that these solutions answer a slightly different question – one phrasing is "you have to announce before a door has been opened whether you plan to switch".

The simple solutions show in various ways that a contestant who is determined to switch will win the car with probability 2/3, and hence that switching is the winning strategy, if the player has to choose in advance between "always switching", and "always staying". However, the probability of winning by always switching is a logically distinct concept from the probability of winning by switching given that the player has picked door 1 and the host has opened door 3. As one source says, "the distinction between [these questions] seems to confound many". The fact that these are different can be shown by varying the problem so that these two probabilities have different numeric values. For example, assume the contestant knows that Monty does not open the second door randomly among all legal alternatives but instead, when given an opportunity to choose between two losing doors, Monty will open the one on the right. In this situation, the following two questions have different answers:

1. What is the probability of winning the car by always switching?
2. What is the probability of winning the car by switching given the player has picked door 1 and the host has opened door 3?

The answer to the first question is 2/3, as is shown correctly by the "simple" solutions. But the answer to the second question is now different: the conditional probability the car is behind door 1 or door 2 given the host has opened door 3 (the door on the right) is 1/2. This is because Monty's preference for rightmost doors means that he opens door 3 if the car is behind door 1 (which it is originally with probability 1/3) or if the car is behind door 2 (also originally with probability 1/3). For this variation, the two questions yield different answers. This is partially because the assumed condition of the second question (that the host opens door 3) would only occur in this variant with probability 2/3. However, as long as the initial probability the car is behind each door is 1/3, it is never to the contestant's disadvantage to switch, as the conditional probability of winning by switching is always at least 1/2.

In Morgan et al., four university professors published an article in The American Statistician claiming that Savant gave the correct advice but the wrong argument. They believed the question asked for the chance of the car behind door 2 given the player's initial choice of door 1 and the game host opening door 3, and they showed this chance was anything between 1/2 and 1 depending on the host's decision process given the choice. Only when the decision is completely randomized is the chance 2/3.

In an invited comment and in subsequent letters to the editor, Morgan et al were supported by some writers, criticized by others; in each case a response by Morgan et al is published alongside the letter or comment in The American Statistician. In particular, Savant defended herself vigorously. Morgan et al complained in their response to Savant that Savant still had not actually responded to their own main point. Later in their response to Hogbin and Nijdam, they did agree that it was natural to suppose that the host chooses a door to open completely at random when he does have a choice, and hence that the conditional probability of winning by switching (i.e., conditional given the situation the player is in when he has to make his choice) has the same value, 2/3, as the unconditional probability of winning by switching (i.e., averaged over all possible situations). This equality was already emphasized by Bell, who suggested that Morgan et al's mathematically-involved solution would appeal only to statisticians, whereas the equivalence of the conditional and unconditional solutions in the case of symmetry was intuitively obvious.

There is disagreement in the literature regarding whether Savant's formulation of the problem, as presented in Parade, is asking the first or second question, and whether this difference is significant. Behrends concludes that "One must consider the matter with care to see that both analyses are correct", which is not to say that they are the same. Several critics of the paper by Morgan et al., whose contributions were published along with the original paper, criticized the authors for altering Savant's wording and misinterpreting her intention. One discussant (William Bell) considered it a matter of taste whether one explicitly mentions that (by the standard conditions) which door is opened by the host is independent of whether one should want to switch.

Among the simple solutions, the "combined doors solution" comes closest to a conditional solution, as shown in the discussion of methods using the concept of odds and Bayes' theorem. It is based on the deeply rooted intuition that revealing information that is already known does not affect probabilities. But, knowing that the host can open one of the two unchosen doors to show a goat does not mean that opening a specific door would not affect the probability that the car is behind the door chosen initially. The point is, though we know in advance that the host will open a door and reveal a goat, we do not know which door he will open. If the host chooses uniformly at random between doors hiding a goat (as is the case in the standard interpretation), this probability indeed remains unchanged, but if the host can choose non-randomly between such doors, then the specific door that the host opens reveals additional information. The host can always open a door revealing a goat and (in the standard interpretation of the problem) the probability that the car is behind the initially chosen door does not change, but it is not because of the former that the latter is true. Solutions based on the assertion that the host's actions cannot affect the probability that the car is behind the initially chosen appear persuasive, but the assertion is simply untrue unless both of the host's two choices are equally likely, if he has a choice. The assertion therefore needs to be justified; without justification being given, the solution is at best incomplete. It can be the case that the answer is correct but the reasoning used to justify it is defective.

== Solutions using conditional probability and other solutions ==
The simple solutions above show that a player with a strategy of switching wins the car with overall probability 2/3, i.e., without taking account of which door was opened by the host. In accordance with this, most sources for the topic of probability calculate the conditional probabilities that the car is behind door 1 and door 2 to be 1/3 and 2/3 respectively given the contestant initially picks door 1 and the host opens door 3. The solutions in this section consider just those cases in which the player picked door 1 and the host opened door 3.

For a solution without explicitly numbering the doors, apply the law of total probability:
$$\begin{aligned}
P(\text{Switch and Win}) = & P(\text{Switch and Win} ~|~ \text{First guess correct}) \, P(\text{First guess correct}) \\
& + P(\text{Switch and Win} ~|~ \text{First guess wrong}) \, P(\text{First guess wrong}).
\end{aligned}$$

Here, a "correct" first guess means that the initially chosen door conceals the car. Since exactly one of the three doors hides the car, $P(\text{First guess correct}) = \tfrac{1}{3}, \quad P(\text{First guess wrong}) = \tfrac{2}{3}.$

Next,
$$P(\text{Switch and Win} ~|~ \text{First guess correct}) = 0,$$
since switching necessarily moves from the car to a goat.

On the other hand,
$$P(\text{Switch and Win} ~|~ \text{First guess wrong}) = 1,$$
because the host reveals a goat among the remaining doors, leaving the only unopened door to conceal the car.

Therefore,
$$P(\text{Switch and Win}) = 0 \times \tfrac{1}{3} + 1 \times \tfrac{2}{3} = \tfrac{2}{3}.$$

=== Refining the simple solution ===
If we assume that the host opens a door at random, when given a choice, then which door the host opens gives us no information at all as to whether or not the car is behind door 1. In the simple solutions, we have already observed that the probability that the car is behind door 1, the door initially chosen by the player, is initially 1/3. Moreover, the host is certainly going to open a (different) door, so opening a door (which door is unspecified) does not change this. 1/3 must be the average of: the probability that the car is behind door 1, given that the host picked door 2, and the probability of car behind door 1, given the host picked door 3: this is because these are the only two possibilities. However, these two probabilities are the same. Therefore, they are both equal to 1/3. This shows that the chance that the car is behind door 1, given that the player initially chose this door and given that the host opened door 3, is 1/3, and it follows that the chance that the car is behind door 2, given that the player initially chose door 1 and the host opened door 3, is 2/3. The analysis also shows that the overall success rate of 2/3, achieved by always switching, cannot be improved, and underlines what already may well have been intuitively obvious: the choice facing the player is that between the door initially chosen, and the other door left closed by the host, the specific numbers on these doors are irrelevant.

=== Conditional probability by direct calculation ===
Tree showing the probability of every possible outcome if the player initially picks Door 1. The sample space consists of exactly four possible outcomes.

By definition, the conditional probability of winning by switching given the contestant initially picks door 1 and the host opens door 3 is the probability for the event "car is behind door 2 and host opens door 3" divided by the probability for "host opens door 3". These probabilities can be determined referring to the conditional probability table below, or to an equivalent decision tree. The conditional probability of winning by switching is 1/3/(1/3 + 1/6), which is 2/3.

The conditional probability table below shows how 300 cases, in all of which the player initially chooses door 1, would be split up, on average, according to the location of the car and the choice of door to open by the host.

Car hidden behind Door 3 (on average, 100 cases out of 300)	Car hidden behind Door 1 (on average, 100 cases out of 300)		Car hidden behind Door 2 (on average, 100 cases out of 300)
Player initially picks Door 1, 300 repetitions
Player has picked Door 1 and the car is behind Door 3	Player has picked Door 1 and the car is behind it		Player has picked Door 1 and the car is behind Door 2
Host must open Door 2 (100 cases)	Host randomly opens Door 2 (on average, 50 cases)	Host randomly opens Door 3 (on average, 50 cases)	Host must open Door 3 (100 cases)
Host must open Door 2 if the player picks Door 1 and the car is behind Door 3	Host opens Door 2 half the time if the player picks Door 1 and the car is behind it	Host opens Door 3 half the time if the player picks Door 1 and the car is behind it	Host must open Door 3 if the player picks Door 1 and the car is behind Door 2
Probability 1/3 (100 out of 300)	Probability 1/6 (50 out of 300)	Probability 1/6 (50 out of 300)	Probability 1/3 (100 out of 300)
Switching wins	Switching loses	Switching loses	Switching wins
On those occasions when the host opens Door 2, switching wins twice as often as staying (100 cases versus 50).		On those occasions when the host opens Door 3, switching wins twice as often as staying (100 cases versus 50).	

=== Bayes' theorem ===
Many probability text books and articles in the field of probability theory derive the conditional probability solution through a formal application of Bayes' theorem — among them books by Gill and Henze. Bayes' theorem states that the conditional probability that the car is behind door 1, given that door 3 was opened, $P(\text{car 1}|\text{open 3})$, can be calculated as
$$P(\text{car 1}|\text{open 3}) = \frac{P(\text{open 3}|\text{car 1})P(\text{car 1})}{P(\text{open 3})}.$$
On the right-hand side are the prior probabilities. The prior probability $P(\text{car 1})$ that the car is behind door 1 is $1/3$, since all outcomes are equally likely as priors. The conditional probability $P(\text{open 3}|\text{car 1})$ that door 3 is open given that the car is in 1 is $1/2$ since each of the doors 2 and 3 are equally likely (neither containing the car). To calculate the denominator, one must use the fact that the events car 1, car 2, and car 3 partition the probability space, which implies
$$P(\text{open 3}) = P(\text{open 3}|\text{car 1})P(\text{car 1}) + P(\text{open 3}|\text{car 2})P(\text{car 2}) + P(\text{open 3}|\text{car 3})P(\text{car 3}).$$
Now, the probability $P(\text{open 3}|\text{car 2})$ that door 3 is opened given that the car is behind door 2 is 1 (because opening door 2 would have revealed the car, not a goat). Finally, the probability $P(\text{open 3}|\text{car 3})$ that door 3 is opened given that the car is behind door 3 is 0, for the same reason. With these three conditional probabilities, the denominator is thus:
$$P(\text{open 3}) = \frac12\cdot\frac13 + 1\cdot\frac13 + 0\cdot\frac13 = \frac12.$$
Putting together numerator and denominator, Bayes' theorem then yields:
$$P(\text{car 1}|\text{open 3}) = \frac{\frac12\cdot\frac13}{\frac12} = \frac13.$$
Thus (complementarily) the probability that the car is behind the only remaining door (door 2) is $2/3$, and so it is wisest to switch.

Some sources advocate the use of the odds form of Bayes' theorem, claiming that it makes the derivation more transparent. Initially, the car is equally likely to be behind any of the three doors: the odds on car 1, car 2, and car 3 are 1∶1∶1. This remains the case after the player has chosen door 1. According to Bayes' rule, the posterior odds on the location of the car, given that the host opens door 3, are equal to the prior odds multiplied by the Bayes factor or likelihood, which is, by definition, the probability of the new piece of information (host opens door 3) under each of the hypotheses considered (location of the car). Now, since the player initially chose door 1, the chance that the host opens door 3 is 50% if the car is behind door 1, 100% if the car is behind door 2, 0% if the car is behind door 3. Thus the Bayes factor consists of the ratios 1/2∶1∶0 or equivalently 1∶2∶0, while the prior odds were 1∶1∶1. Thus, the posterior odds become equal to the Bayes factor 1∶2∶0. Given that the host opened door 3, the probability that the car is behind door 3 is zero, and it is twice as likely to be behind door 2 than door 1.

Richard Gill analyzes the likelihood for the host to open door 3 as follows. Given that the car is not behind door 1, it is equally likely that it is behind door 2 or 3. Therefore, the chance that the host opens door 3 is 50%. Given that the car is behind door 1, the chance that the host opens door 3 is also 50%, because, when the host has a choice, either choice is equally likely. Therefore, whether or not the car is behind door 1, the chance that the host opens door 3 is 50%. The information "host opens door 3" contributes a Bayes factor or likelihood ratio of 1∶1, on whether or not the car is behind door 1. Initially, the odds against door 1 hiding the car were 2∶1. Therefore, the posterior odds against door 1 hiding the car remain the same as the prior odds, 2∶1.

In words, the information which door is opened by the host (door 2 or door 3?) reveals no information at all about whether or not the car is behind door 1, and this is precisely what is alleged to be intuitively obvious by supporters of simple solutions, or using the idioms of mathematical proofs, "obviously true, by symmetry".

=== Solutions by simulation ===
Simulation of 29 outcomes of the Monty Hall problem

A simple way to demonstrate that a switching strategy really does win two out of three times with the standard assumptions is to simulate the game with playing cards. Three cards from an ordinary deck are used to represent the three doors; one 'special' card represents the door with the car and two other cards represent the goat doors.

The simulation can be repeated several times to simulate multiple rounds of the game. The player picks one of the three cards, then, looking at the remaining two cards the 'host' discards a goat card. If the card remaining in the host's hand is the car card, this is recorded as a switching win; if the host is holding a goat card, the round is recorded as a staying win. As this experiment is repeated over several rounds, the observed win rate for each strategy is likely to approximate its theoretical win probability, in line with the law of large numbers.

Repeated plays also make it clearer why switching is the better strategy. After the player picks his card, it is already determined whether switching will win the round for the player. If this is not convincing, the simulation can be done with the entire deck. In this variant, the car card goes to the host 51 times out of 52, and stays with the host no matter how many non-car cards are discarded.

== Variants ==
A common variant of the problem, which some academic authors regard as the canonical problem, does not make the simplifying assumption that the host must uniformly choose the door to open, but instead that he uses some other strategy. The confusion as to which formalization is authoritative has led to considerable acrimony, particularly because this variant makes proofs more involved without altering the optimality of the always-switch strategy for the player. In this variant, the player can have different probabilities of winning depending on the observed choice of the host, but in any case the probability of winning by switching is at least 1/2 (and can be as high as 1), while the overall probability of winning by switching is still exactly 2/3. The variants are sometimes presented in succession in textbooks and articles intended to teach the basics of probability theory and game theory. A considerable number of other generalizations have also been studied.

=== Other host behaviors ===
The version of the Monty Hall problem published in Parade in 1990 did not specifically state that the host would always open another door, or always offer a choice to switch, or even never open the door revealing the car. However, Savant made it clear in her second follow-up column that the intended host's behavior could only be what led to the 2/3 probability she gave as her original answer. "Anything else is a different question." "Virtually all of my critics understood the intended scenario. I personally read nearly three thousand letters (out of the many additional thousands that arrived) and found nearly every one insisting simply that because two options remained (or an equivalent error), the chances were even. Very few raised questions about ambiguity, and the letters actually published in the column were not among those few." The answer follows if the car is placed randomly behind any door, the host must open a door revealing a goat regardless of the player's initial choice and, if two doors are available, chooses which one to open randomly. The table below shows a variety of other possible host behaviors and the impact on the success of switching.

Determining the player's best strategy within a given set of other rules the host must follow is the type of problem studied in game theory. For example, if the host is not required to make the offer to switch the player may suspect the host is malicious and makes the offers more often if the player has initially selected the car. In general, the answer to this sort of question depends on the specific assumptions made about the host's behavior, and might range from "ignore the host completely" to "toss a coin and switch if it comes up heads"; see the last row of the table below.

Morgan et al and Gillman both show a more general solution where the car is (uniformly) randomly placed but the host is not constrained to pick uniformly randomly if the player has initially selected the car, which is how they both interpret the statement of the problem in Parade despite the author's disclaimers. Both changed the wording of the Parade version to emphasize that point when they restated the problem. They consider a scenario where the host chooses between revealing two goats with a preference expressed as a probability q, having a value between 0 and 1. If the host picks randomly q would be 1/2 and switching wins with probability 2/3 regardless of which door the host opens. If the player picks door 1 and the host's preference for door 3 is q, then the probability the host opens door 3 and the car is behind door 2 is 1/3, while the probability the host opens door 3 and the car is behind door 1 is q/3. These are the only cases where the host opens door 3, so the conditional probability of winning by switching given the host opens door 3 is
$$P|_{\mathrm{switching}} = \frac{{1\over3}}{{1\over3}+{q\over3}}$$
which simplifies to 1/(1 + q). Since q can vary between 0 and 1, this conditional probability can vary between 1/2 and 1. This means even without constraining the host to pick randomly if the player initially selects the car, the player is never worse off switching. However neither source suggests the player knows what the value of q is so the player cannot attribute a probability other than the 2/3 that Savant assumed was implicit.

Possible host behaviors in unspecified problem
Host behavior	Result
The host acts as noted in the specific version of the problem.	Switching wins the car two-thirds of the time. (Specific case of the generalized form below with p = q = 1/2)
The host always reveals a goat and always offers a switch. If and only if he has a choice, he chooses the leftmost goat with probability p (which may depend on the player's initial choice) and the rightmost door with probability q = 1 − p.	If the host opens the rightmost (P = 1/3 + q/3) door, switching wins with probability 1/(1+q). Vice versa, if the host opens the leftmost door, switching wins with probability 1/(1+p). Always switching is the sum of these: (1/3 + q/3) / (1+q) + (1/3 + p/3) / (1+p) = 1/3 + 1/3 = 2/3.
"Monty from Hell": The host offers the option to switch only when the player's initial choice is the winning door.	Switching always yields a goat.
"Mind-reading Monty": The host offers the option to switch in case the guest is determined to stay anyway or in case the guest will switch to a goat.	Switching always yields a goat.
"Angelic Monty": The host offers the option to switch only when the player has chosen incorrectly.	Switching always wins the car.
"Monty Fall" or "Ignorant Monty": The host does not know what lies behind the doors, and opens one at random that happens not to reveal the car.	Switching wins the car half of the time.
The host knows what lies behind the doors, and (before the player's choice) chooses at random which goat to reveal. He offers the option to switch only when the player's choice happens to differ from his.	Switching wins the car half of the time.
The host opens a door and makes the offer to switch 100% of the time if the contestant initially picked the car, and 50% the time otherwise.	Switching wins 1/2 the time at the Nash equilibrium.
Four-stage two-player game-theoretic. The player is playing against the show organizers (TV station) which includes the host. First stage: organizers choose a door (choice kept secret from player). Second stage: player makes a preliminary choice of door. Third stage: host opens a door. Fourth stage: player makes a final choice. The player wants to win the car, the TV station wants to keep it. This is a zero-sum two-person game. By von Neumann's theorem from game theory, if we allow both parties fully randomized strategies there exists a minimax solution or Nash equilibrium.	Minimax solution (Nash equilibrium): car is first hidden uniformly at random and host later chooses uniform random door to open without revealing the car and different from player's door; player first chooses uniform random door and later always switches to other closed door. With his strategy, the player has a win-chance of at least 2/3, however the TV station plays; with the TV station's strategy, the TV station will lose with probability at most 2/3, however the player plays. The fact that these two strategies match (at least 2/3, at most 2/3) proves that they form the minimax solution.
As previous, but now host has option not to open a door at all.	Minimax solution (Nash equilibrium): car is first hidden uniformly at random and host later never opens a door; player first chooses a door uniformly at random and later never switches. Player's strategy guarantees a win-chance of at least 1/3. TV station's strategy guarantees a lose-chance of at most 1/3.
Deal or No Deal case: the host asks the player to open a door, then offers a switch in case the car has not been revealed.	Switching wins the car half of the time.

=== N doors ===
D. L. Ferguson suggests an N-door generalization of the original problem in which the host opens p losing doors and then offers the player the opportunity to switch; in this variant switching wins with probability $\frac{1}{N} \cdot \frac{N-1}{N-p-1}$. This probability is always greater than 1/N, therefore switching always brings an advantage.

Even if the host opens only a single door (p = 1), the player is better off switching in every case. As N grows larger, the advantage decreases and approaches zero. At the other extreme, if the host opens all losing doors but one (p = N − 2) the advantage increases as N grows large (the probability of winning by switching is (N − 1)/N, which approaches 1 as N grows very large).

=== Quantum version ===
A quantum version of the paradox illustrates some points about the relation between classical or non-quantum information and quantum information, as encoded in the states of quantum mechanical systems. The formulation is loosely based on quantum game theory. The three doors are replaced by a quantum system allowing three alternatives; opening a door and looking behind it is translated as making a particular measurement. The rules can be stated in this language, and once again the choice for the player is to stick with the initial choice, or change to another "orthogonal" option. The latter strategy turns out to double the chances, just as in the classical case. However, if the show host has not randomized the position of the prize in a fully quantum mechanical way, the player can do even better, and can sometimes even win the prize with certainty.

== History ==
The earliest of several probability puzzles related to the Monty Hall problem is Bertrand's box paradox, posed by Joseph Bertrand in 1889 in his Calcul des probabilités. In this puzzle, there are three boxes: a box containing two gold coins, a box with two silver coins, and a box with one of each. After choosing a box at random and withdrawing one coin at random that happens to be a gold coin, the question is what is the probability that the other coin is gold. As in the Monty Hall problem, the intuitive answer is 1/2, but the probability is actually 2/3.

The three prisoners problem, published in Martin Gardner's Mathematical Games column in Scientific American in 1959 is equivalent to the Monty Hall problem. This problem involves three condemned prisoners, a random one of whom has been secretly chosen to be pardoned. One of the prisoners begs the warden to tell him the name of one of the others to be executed, arguing that this reveals no information about his own fate but increases his chances of being pardoned from 1/3 to 1/2. The warden obliges, (secretly) flipping a coin to decide which name to provide if the prisoner who is asking is the one being pardoned. The question is whether knowing the warden's answer changes the prisoner's chances of being pardoned. This problem is equivalent to the Monty Hall problem; the prisoner asking the question still has a 1/3 chance of being pardoned but his unnamed colleague has a 2/3 chance.

Steve Selvin posed the Monty Hall problem in a pair of letters to The American Statistician in 1975. The first letter presented the problem in a version close to its presentation in Parade 15 years later. The second appears to be the first use of the term "Monty Hall problem". The problem is actually an extrapolation from the game show. Monty Hall did open a wrong door to build excitement, but offered a known lesser prize – such as $100 cash – rather than a choice to switch doors. As Monty Hall wrote to Selvin:

And if you ever get on my show, the rules hold fast for you – no trading boxes after the selection.

A version of the problem very similar to the one that appeared three years later in Parade was published in 1987 in the Puzzles section of The Journal of Economic Perspectives. Nalebuff, as later writers in mathematical economics, sees the problem as a simple and amusing exercise in game theory.

"The Monty Hall Trap", Phillip Martin's 1989 article in Bridge Today, presented Selvin's problem as an example of what Martin calls the probability trap of treating non-random information as if it were random, and relates this to concepts in the game of bridge.

A restated version of Selvin's problem appeared in Marilyn vos Savant's Ask Marilyn question-and-answer column of Parade in September 1990. Though Savant gave the correct answer that switching would win two-thirds of the time, she estimates the magazine received 10,000 letters including close to 1,000 signed by PhD holders, many on letterheads of mathematics and science departments, declaring that her solution was wrong. Due to the overwhelming response, Parade published an unprecedented four columns on the problem. As a result of the publicity the problem earned the alternative name "Marilyn and the Goats".

In November 1990, an equally contentious discussion of Savant's article took place in Cecil Adams's column "The Straight Dope". Adams initially answered, incorrectly, that the chances for the two remaining doors must each be one in two. After a reader wrote in to correct the mathematics of Adams's analysis, Adams agreed that mathematically he had been wrong. "You pick door #1. Now you're offered this choice: open door #1, or open door #2 and door #3. In the latter case you keep the prize if it's behind either door. You'd rather have a two-in-three shot at the prize than one-in-three, wouldn't you? If you think about it, the original problem offers you basically the same choice. Monty is saying in effect: you can keep your one door or you can have the other two doors, one of which (a non-prize door) I'll open for you." Adams did say the Parade version left critical constraints unstated, and without those constraints, the chances of winning by switching were not necessarily two out of three (e.g., it was not reasonable to assume the host always opens a door). Numerous readers, however, wrote in to claim that Adams had been "right the first time" and that the correct chances were one in two.

The Parade column and its response received considerable attention in the press, including a front-page story in The New York Times in which Monty Hall himself was interviewed. Hall understood the problem, giving the reporter a demonstration with car keys and explaining how actual game play on Let's Make a Deal differed from the rules of the puzzle. In the article, Hall pointed out that because he had control over the way the game progressed, playing on the psychology of the contestant, the theoretical solution did not apply to the show's actual gameplay. He said he was not surprised at the experts' insistence that the probability was 1 out of 2. "That's the same assumption contestants would make on the show after I showed them there was nothing behind one door," he said. "They'd think the odds on their door had now gone up to 1 in 2, so they hated to give up the door no matter how much money I offered. By opening that door we were applying pressure. We called it the Henry James treatment. It was 'The Turn of the Screw'." Hall clarified that as a game show host he did not have to follow the rules of the puzzle in the Savant column and did not always have to allow a person the opportunity to switch (e.g., he might open their door immediately if it was a losing door, might offer them money to not switch from a losing door to a winning door, or might allow them the opportunity to switch only if they had a winning door). "If the host is required to open a door all the time and offer you a switch, then you should take the switch," he said. "But if he has the choice whether to allow a switch or not, beware. Caveat emptor. It all depends on his mood."

== See also ==
- MythBusters Episode 177 "Wheel of Mythfortune" – Pick a Door
- Principle of restricted choice – similar application of Bayesian updating in contract bridge

=== Similar puzzles in probability and decision theory ===
- Boy or Girl paradox
- Sleeping Beauty problem
- Two envelopes problem
