= Nifty Fifty =

Group of 50 companies on the New York Stock Exchange in the 1960s–1970s

In the United States, the term Nifty Fifty was an informal designation for a group of roughly fifty large-cap stocks on the New York Stock Exchange in the 1960s and 1970s that were widely regarded as solid buy and hold growth stocks, or "blue-chip" stocks. These fifty stocks are credited by historians with propelling the bull market of the early 1970s, while their subsequent crash and underperformance through the early 1980s are an example of what may occur following a period during which many investors ignore fundamental stock valuation metrics, to instead make decisions on popular sentiment. Roughly half of the Nifty Fifty have since recovered and are solid performers, although a few are now defunct or otherwise worthless.

Investor Howard Marks reports that about half of the Nifty Fifty "compiled respectable returns for 25 years, even when measured from their pre-crash highs, suggesting that very high valuations can be fundamentally justified." On the other hand, Professor Jeremy Siegel analyzed the Nifty Fifty era in his book Stocks for the Long Run, and determined companies that routinely sold for P/E ratios above 50 consistently performed worse than the broader market (as measured by the S&P 500) in the next 25 years, with only a few exceptions.

== Characteristics ==
The stocks were often described as "one-decision", as they were viewed as extremely stable, even over long periods of time.

The most common characteristic by the constituents were solid earnings growth for which these stocks were assigned extraordinary high price–earnings ratios. Trading at fifty times earnings or higher was common, far above the long-term market average of about 15 to 20.

== NYSE Nifty Fifty constituents ==
Note: There is no official version of companies composing the list, but the following companies were often included among the Nifty Fifty:

- American Express
- American Home Products
- American Hospital Supply Corporation
- AMP Inc
- Anheuser-Busch
- Avon Products
- Baxter International
- Black & Decker
- Bristol-Myers
- Burroughs Corporation
- Chesebrough-Ponds
- Coca-Cola Company
- Digital Equipment Corporation
- Dow Chemical
- Eastman Kodak
- Eli Lilly and Company
- Emery Air Freight
- First National City Bank
- General Electric
- Gillette
- Halliburton
- Heublein
- IBM
- International Flavors & Fragrances
- International Telephone & Telegraph
- JCPenney
- Johnson & Johnson
- Louisiana Land & Exploration
- Lubrizol
- Minnesota Mining and Manufacturing (3M)
- McDonald's
- Merck & Co
- MGIC Investment Corporation
- PepsiCo
- Pfizer
- Philip Morris Cos.
- Polaroid
- Procter & Gamble
- Revlon
- Schering Plough
- Joseph Schlitz Brewing Company
- Schlumberger
- Sears, Roebuck & Company
- Simplicity Pattern
- Squibb
- S.S. Kresge
- Texas Instruments
- Upjohn
- Walt Disney Company
- Walmart
- Xerox

== U.S. bear market of the 1970s ==
The long bear market of the 1970s which began with the 1973–74 stock market crash and lasted until 1982 caused valuations of the nifty fifty to fall to low levels along with the rest of the market, with most of these stocks under-performing the broader market averages. A notable exception was Wal-Mart, the best performing stock on the list, with a 29.65% compounded annualized return over a 29-year period. However, Wal-Mart's initial public offering was in 1970 and only started trading on the NYSE on August 25, 1972, at the end of the bull market.

Because of the under-performance of most of the nifty fifty list, it is often cited as an example of unrealistic investor expectations for growth stocks.

== See also ==
- Big Tech – Largest and most influential technology companies in the world
- Dow Jones Industrial Index – American stock market index composed of 30 industry leaders
- Magnificent Seven (stocks) – Largest and most influential technology companies in the world
