= Raymond S. Nickerson =

American psychologist and author

Raymond S. Nickerson was an American psychologist and author. He was a senior vice president at BBN Technologies, from which he retired, and spent time as a research professor at Tufts University in the Psychology Department. He authored several books and was the founding editor of The Journal of Experimental Psychology: Applied.

Topics he wrote about include: confirmation bias, null hypothesis significance testing, the exchange paradox the boy or girl paradox and long-term memory

== Work ==
Books:

- The Teaching of Thinking (with David N. Perkins & Edward E. Smith) (1985) Erlbaum.
- Using Computers: Human Factors in Information Systems (1986) MIT Press.
- Reflections on Reasoning (1986) Erlbaum.
- Looking Ahead: Human Factors Challenges in a Changing World (1992) Erlbaum.
- Psychology and Environmental Change (2003) Erlbaum.
- Cognition and Chance: The Psychology of Probabilistic Reasoning (2004) Erlbaum.
- Aspects of Rationality: Reflections on What it Means to be Rational and Whether we are (2008) Psychology Press.
- Mathematical Reasoning: Patterns, Problems, Conjectures and Proofs (2010) Psychology Press.
- Conditional Reasoning: The Unruly Syntactics, Semantics, Thematics, and Pragmatics of "If" (2015) Oxford University Press.

== Membership ==
- Fellow:
  - American Association for the Advancement of Science
  - American Psychological Association
  - Association for Psychological Science
  - Human Factors and Ergonomics Society
  - Society of Experimental Psychologists

== Selected works ==
- 1996. "Hempel's Paradox and Wason's Selection Task: Logical and Psychological Puzzles of Confirmation," Thinking and Reasoning 2, 1-31
- 1998. "Confirmation Bias: A Ubiquitous Phenomenon in Many Guises," Review of General Psychology vol. 2, no. 2, 175-220
- 2009, with F. S. Butler & M. Carlin. "Empathy and Knowledge Projection," in Decety & Ickes (Eds.), Social Neuroscience of Empathy (pp. 43–56). Cambridge, MA: MIT Press.
