= Stocks for the Long Run =

1994 book by Jeremy Siegel

- The fourth edition cover
- Author: Jeremy J. Siegel
- Language: English
- Publisher: McGraw-Hill
- Publication date: 1994
- Publication place: United States
- Pages: 380
- ISBN: 978-1-55623-804-8
- OCLC: 29361231
- Dewey Decimal: 332.63/22 20
- LC Class: HG4661 .S53 1994

Stocks for the Long Run is a book on investing by Jeremy Siegel. Its first edition was released in 1994, and its most recent, the sixth, was so on October 4, 2022. According to Pablo Galarza of Money, "His 1994 book Stocks for the Long Run sealed the conventional wisdom that most of us should be in the stock market." James K. Glassman, a financial columnist for The Washington Post, called it one of the 10 best investment books of all time.

== Overview ==
Siegel is a professor of finance at the Wharton School of the University of Pennsylvania and a contributor to financial publications like The Wall Street Journal, Barron's, The New York Times, and the Financial Times.

The book takes a long-term view of the financial markets, starting in 1802, mainly in the United States (but with some comparisons to other financial markets as well). Siegel takes an empirical perspective in answering investing questions.

Even though the book has been termed "the buy and hold Bible", the author occasionally concedes that there are market inefficiencies that can be exploited.

Siegel argues that stocks have returned an average of 6.5 percent to 7 percent per year after inflation over the last 200 years. He expects returns to be somewhat lower in the next couple of decades. In an article presented at the Equity Risk Premium forum of November 8, 2001, Siegel states:

An analysis of the historical relationships among real stock returns, P/Es, earnings growth, and dividend yields and an awareness of the biases justify a future P/E of 20 to 25, an economic growth rate of 3 percent, expected real returns for equities of 4.5–5.5 percent, and an equity risk premium of 2 percent (200 bps).

== Outline ==
The book covers the following topics:

- The Verdict of History: Stock and Bond Returns since 1802, Risk, Return and the Coming Age Wave and Perspectives on Stocks as Investments.
- Stock Returns: Stock Averages, Dividends, Earnings, and Investor Sentiment, Large Stocks, Small Stocks, Value Stocks, Growth Stocks, The Nifty Fifty Revisited, Taxes and Stock Returns, Global Investing.
- Economic Environment of Investing: Money, Gold, and Central Banks, Inflation and Stocks, Stocks and the Business Cycle, World Events Which Impact Financial Markets, Stocks, Bonds and the Flow of Economic Data.
- Stock Fluctuations in the Short Run: Stock Index Futures, Options and Spiders, Market Volatility and the Stock Crash of October 1987, Technical Analysis and Investing with the Trend (here Siegel claims that the use of a 200-day moving average to analyze investments does not improve returns nor reduce risk for the Dow Jones Industrial Average, but it seems to benefit the NASDAQ index), Calendar Anomalies (Siegel accepts seasonality in the stock market).
- Building Wealth Through Stocks: Funds, Managers, and 'Beating the Market', Structuring a Portfolio for Long-Term Growth.

According to Siegel's web site the next edition will include a chapter on globalization with the premise that the growth of emerging economies will soon out pace that of the developed nations. A discussion on fundamentally weighted indexes which have historically resulted in better returns and lower volatility may also be added.

== Principles ==
The data below is taken from Table 1.1, 1.2, Fig 1.5 and Fig 6.4 in the 2002 edition of the book.

Key Data Findings: annual real returns
Duration	Stocks	Gold	Bonds	Dividend Yld	Inflation rt	Eqity Prem	Fed Model
1871–2001	6.8	-0.1	2.8	4.6	2.0	0–11	NA
1946–1965	10.0	-2.7	-1.2	4.6	2.8	3–11	NA
1966–1981	-0.4	8.8	-4.2	3.9	7.0	11–6	TY<EY
1982–2001	10.5	-4.8	8.5	2.9	3.2	6–3	YT>=EY.

This table presents some of the main findings presented in Chapter 1 and some related text. Stocks on the long term have returned 6.8% per year after inflation, whereas gold has returned -0.4% (i.e. failed to keep up with inflation) and bonds have returned 1.7%. The equity risk premium (excess return of stocks over bonds) has ranged between 0 and 11%, it was 3% in 2001. Also see where equity risk premium is computed slightly differently. The Fed model of stock valuation was not applicable before 1966. Before 1982, the treasury yields were generally less than stock earnings yield.

Why the long-term return is relatively constant, remains a mystery.

The dividend yield is correlated with real GDP growth, as shown in Table 6.1.

Explanation of abnormal behavior:

- The low stock return during 1966–81 (and high gold return) was due to very high inflation.
- The equity risk premium rose to about 11% in 1965, however that should be unsustainable over a very long term.

In Chapter 2, he argues (Figure 2.1) that given a sufficiently long period of time, stocks are less risky than bonds, where risk is defined as the standard deviation of annual return. During 1802–2001, the worst 1-year returns for stocks and bonds were -38.6% and -21.9% respectively. However, for a holding period of 10-years, the worst performance for stocks and bonds were -4.1% and -5.4%; and for a holding period of 20 years, stocks have always been profitable. Figure 2.6 shows that the optimally lowest risk portfolio even for a one-year holding, will include some stocks.

In Chapter 5, he shows that after-tax returns for bonds can be negative for a significant period of time.

Key Data Findings: after-tax annual real returns
Duration	Stocks	Stocks after tax	Bonds	Bonds after tax
1871–2001	6.8	5.4	2.8	1.8
1946–1965	10.0	7.0	−1.2	−2.0
1966–1981	−0.4	−2.2	−4.2	−6.1
1982–2001	10.5	6.1	8.5	5.1

== Criticism ==
Some critics argue that the book uses a perspective that is too long to be applicable to today's long-term investors who, in many cases, are not investing for a 20–30 year period.

Furthermore, critics argue that picking different start and end dates, or different starting valuations, can yield significantly different results. Over certain long term periods, assets such as bonds, commodities, real estate, foreign equities or gold significantly outperform US stocks, usually when the starting valuation for stocks is significantly higher than the norm.

Economist Robert Shiller of Yale University, wrote in his book Irrational Exuberance (Princeton, 2000) even a 20 or 30 year holding period is not necessarily as risk-free as Siegel implies. Purchasing stocks at a high valuation based on the CAPE ratio can yield poor returns over the long term, as well as significant drawdowns in the interim. Shiller also notes that the 20th century, on which many of Siegel's conclusions are based, was the most successful century for stocks in the short history of the United States and such performance may not be repeated in the future.

In 2019, Edward F. McQuarrie has published results showing that while the stocks outperformed bonds during 1943–1982, the return from stocks was about equal to the bonds during 1797–1942. After 1982, the bonds have slightly outperformed the stocks. McQuarrie also noted Siegel relied heavily on earlier flawed interpretations of Frederick Macaulay's seminal The Movements of Interest Rates (1938), thus Siegel "under-estimate[d] 19th century bond returns" by about 1.5%. The yield on 10 Year Treasurys bottomed in early 1940s and then peaked at 15.6% in late 1981, and the long term decline in rates has continued.

== Publication history ==
- Siegel, Jeremy J. (January 15, 1994). Stocks for the Long Run: A Guide to Selecting Markets for Long-term Growth. Burr Ridge, Illinois: Irwin Professional Publishing. p. 388. ISBN 978-1-55623-804-8.
- Siegel, Jeremy J. (March 1, 1998). Stocks for the Long Run : The Definitive Guide to Financial Market Returns and Long-Term Investment Strategies (2nd ed.). New York: McGraw-Hill. p. 388. ISBN 978-0-07-058043-5.
- Siegel, Jeremy J. (June 21, 2002). Stocks for the Long Run : The Definitive Guide to Financial Market Returns and Long-Term Investment Strategies (3rd ed.). New York: McGraw-Hill. p. 388. ISBN 978-0-07-137048-6.
- Siegel, Jeremy J. (November 27, 2007). Stocks for the Long Run : The Definitive Guide to Financial Market Returns and Long-Term Investment Strategies (4th ed.). New York: McGraw-Hill. p. 436. ISBN 978-0-07-149470-0.
- Siegel, Jeremy J. (January 7, 2014). Stocks for the Long Run : The Definitive Guide to Financial Market Returns and Long-Term Investment Strategies (5th ed.). New York: McGraw-Hill. p. 448. ISBN 978-0-07-180051-8.
- Siegel, Jeremy J. (September 27, 2022). Stocks for the Long Run : The Definitive Guide to Financial Market Returns and Long-Term Investment Strategies (6th ed.). New York: McGraw-Hill. p. 448. ISBN 978-1-26-426980-8.

== See also ==
- Stock picking
- List of valuation topics
- Capital asset pricing model
- Value at risk
- Fundamental analysis
- Technical analysis
- Fed model Theory of Equity Valuation
- Undervalued stock
- Case–Shiller index
