= Siegel's paradox =

Financial phenomenon

Siegel's paradox is the phenomenon that uncertainty about future prices can theoretically push rational consumers to temporarily trade away their preferred consumption goods (or currency) for non-preferred goods (or currency), as part of a plan to trade back to the preferred consumption goods after prices become clearer. For example, in some models, Americans can expect to earn more American dollars on average by investing in Euros, while Europeans can expect to earn more Euros on average by investing in American dollars. The paradox was identified by economist Jeremy Siegel in 1972. Like the related two envelopes problem, the phenomenon is sometimes labeled a paradox because an agent can seem to trade for something of equal monetary value and yet, paradoxically, seem at the same time to gain monetary value from the trade. Closer analysis shows that the "monetary value" of the trade is ambiguous but that nevertheless such trades are often favorable, depending on the scenario.

== Apple/orange example ==
Economist Fischer Black gave the following illustration in 1995. Suppose that the exchange rate between an "apple" country where consumers prefer apples, and an "orange" country where consumers prefer valuable oranges, is currently 1:1, but will change next year to 2:1 or 1:2 with equal probability. Suppose an apple consumer trades an apple to an orange consumer in exchange for an orange. The apple consumer now has given up an apple for an orange, which next year has an expected value of 1.25 apples. The orange consumer now has given up an orange for an apple, which next year has an expected value of 1.25 oranges. Thus both appear to have benefited from the exchange on average. Mathematically, the apparent surplus is related to Jensen's inequality.

== Wine example ==
A more detailed example is a simplified efficient market with two wines, an American wine and a German wine. In November the wines trade 1:1. In December, most consumers will put exactly twice as much value on the trendier wine than the non-trendy wine; there is a 50/50 chance that either wine will become the trendy one in December. Thus, the wines are equally likely to trade 1:2 or 2:1 in December. Most consumers care about the nationality only insofar as it influences which wine is trendy. The only exceptions are a single loyalist American consumer, who only drinks American wine and is indifferent to trendiness, and a single loyalist German consumer, whose only drinks German wine and is likewise indifferent to trendiness.

The American loyalist counter-intuitively prefers to hold a German rather than an American wine in November, as it has a 50% chance of being tradeable for 0.5 American wines, and a 50% chance of being tradeable for 2 American wines, and thus has an expected value of 1.25 American wines. (All the consumers in this scenario are risk-neutral). Similarly, the German, if she holds an American wine, can be considered to be in possession of an expected value of 1.25 German wines. In this case, the gains from Siegel's paradox are real, and each loyalist gains utility on average by temporarily trading away from their preferred consumption good, due to the large utility gain should they succeed in the gambit of saving up in hopes of buying multiple bottles of the preferred wine should the price plummet in December.

Analyzing the case of the trendy consumers, who are indifferent to the nationality apart from its trendiness, is more complex. Such a consumer, if in possession of American wine, might fallaciously reason: "I currently have 1 American wine. If I trade for a German wine, I will have an expected value of 1.25 American wines. Therefore, I will be better off on average if I adopt a strategy to temporarily trade away, as the American loyalist did." However, this is similar to the "two envelopes problem", and the gains from Siegel's paradox in this case are illusory. The trendy consumer who uses the American loyalist's strategy is left with a 50% chance of 0.5 bottles of a newly popular trendy American wine, and a 50% chance of 2 bottles of a newly unpopular non-trendy American wine; to the trendy consumer this is not a material improvement over having a 50% chance of a bottle of trendy American wine and a 50% chance of having a bottle of non-trendy American wine. Thus, the trendy consumer has merely broken even, on average. Similarly, the trendy consumer also would not gain utility from adopting the German loyalist's strategy.

== Applications ==
While the wine and the apples are toy examples, the paradox has a real-world application to what currencies investors should choose to hold. Fischer Black concluded from analyses similar to the apple/orange example that when investing overseas, investors should not seek to hedge all their currency risk. Other researchers consider such an analysis simplistic. In many circumstances, Siegel's paradox should indeed drive a rational investor to become more willing to embrace modest currency risk. In many other circumstances, they should not; for example, if the exchange rate uncertainty is due to differing rates of inflation with the imposition of purchasing power parity, then something like the "two envelopes" analysis applies, and there may be no particular reason to embrace currency risk.

== Geometric mean and reciprocity functions ==
A different approach to Siegel's paradox is proposed by K. Mallahi-Karai and P. Safari, where they show that the only possible way to avoid making risk-less money in such future-based currency exchanges is to settle on the (weighted) geometric mean of the future exchange rates, or more generally a product of the weighted geometric mean and a so-called reciprocity function. The weights of the geometric mean depend on the probability of the rates occurring in the future, while the reciprocity function can always be taken to be the unit function. What this implies, for instance, in the case of apple/orange example above, is that the consumers should trade their products for √(2)(1/2) = 1 units of the other product to avoid an arbitrage. This method will provide currency traders on both sides with a common exchange rate they can safely agree on.
