= Maurice Kraitchik =

Belgian mathematician

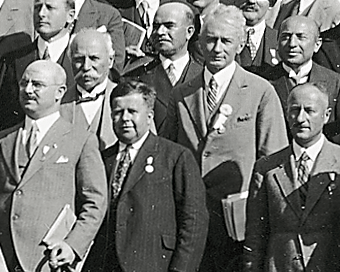
Maurice Kraitchik (mid of top row, facing left) at the International Congress of Mathematicians, Zürich 1932

Maurice Borisovich Kraitchik (21 April 1882 – 19 August 1957) was a Belgian mathematician and populariser. His main interests were the theory of numbers and recreational mathematics.

He was born to a Jewish family in Minsk. He wrote several books on number theory during 1922–1930 and after the war, and from 1931 to 1939 edited Sphinx, a periodical devoted to recreational mathematics. During World War II, he emigrated to the United States, where he taught a course at the New School for Social Research in New York City on the general topic of "mathematical recreations."

Kraïtchik was agrégé of the Free University of Brussels, engineer at the Société Financière de Transports et d'Entreprises Industrielles (Sofina), and director of the Institut des Hautes Études de Belgique. He died in Brussels.

Kraïtchik is famous for having inspired the two envelopes problem in 1953, with the following puzzle in La mathématique des jeux:

Two people, equally rich, meet to compare the contents of their wallets. Each is ignorant of the contents of the two wallets. The game is as follows: whoever has the least money receives the contents of the wallet of the other (in the case where the amounts are equal, nothing happens). One of the two men can reason: "Suppose that I have the amount A in my wallet. That's the maximum that I could lose. If I win (probability 0.5), the amount that I'll have in my possession at the end of the game will be more than 2A. Therefore the game is favourable to me." The other man can reason in exactly the same way. In fact, by symmetry, the game is fair. Where is the mistake in the reasoning of each man?

Among his publications were the following:

- Théorie des Nombres, Paris: Gauthier-Villars, 1922
- Recherches sur la théorie des nombres, Paris: Gauthier-Villars, 1924
- La mathématique des jeux ou Récréations mathématiques, Paris: Vuibert, 1930, 566 pages
- Mathematical Recreations, New York: W. W. Norton, 1942 and London: George Allen & Unwin Ltd, 1943, 328 pages (revised edition New York: Dover, 1953)
- Alignment Charts, New York: Van Nostrand, 1944
