= Boost ETP =

British independent boutique Exchange Traded Products provider

Boost ETP LLP.
- Type: Subsidiary
- Industry: Financial services
- Founded: 2012
- Headquarters: London, EC2; United Kingdom
- Key people: Ian 'Hector' McNeil (CO-CEO), Nik Bienkowski (CO-CEO)
- Products: Exchange-traded products Exchange-trade commodities Asset management
- Parent: WisdomTree Investments
- Website: Boostetp.com

Boost ETP is an independent boutique Exchange Traded Products (ETP) provider, based in London, United Kingdom. Boost ETP is the first asset management firm in Europe to offer 3x leveraged ETPs and 3x short ETPs. The first Boost ETP products became available on 6 December 2012 on the London Stock Exchange.

== History ==
Boost ETP LLP was set up by Ian 'Hector' McNeil and Nik Bienkowski, former Managing Partners of ETF Securities. On 11 December 2012 McNeil and Bienkowski were invited to the London Stock Exchange to formally open the London markets in order to mark the launch of 20 new ETPs offered by Boost ETP. In its first year of existence Boost ETP won the ETF Express "Most Innovative European ETP Provider" for 2013.

Leveraged ETFs / ETPs have been part of the investment scene in North America since ProShares introduced "Ultra ProShares" in 2006 and have since grown rapidly. Even though this was preceded by the introduction of the world's first leveraged ETFs in Sweden in 2005 by XACT the European market remained underdeveloped. The ETF market in Europe is generally seen to be five to ten years behind the American market, a theory that appears to be consistent with leveraged ETPs. Due to the offerings of companies like PowerShares and Direxion the US ETF market has a range of 3x leveraged and inverse ETFs, this is not the case in Europe. Having spotted an opportunity to create niche value Boost ETP was set up in order to satisfy European demand for 3x leveraged and short ETPs.

In 2014, WisdomTree Investments acquired a majority stake (75%) in Boost ETP. WisdomTree will invested $20 million in Boost ETP to give it working capital to build out its European business.
