= Jeremy Siegel =

American economist (born 1945)

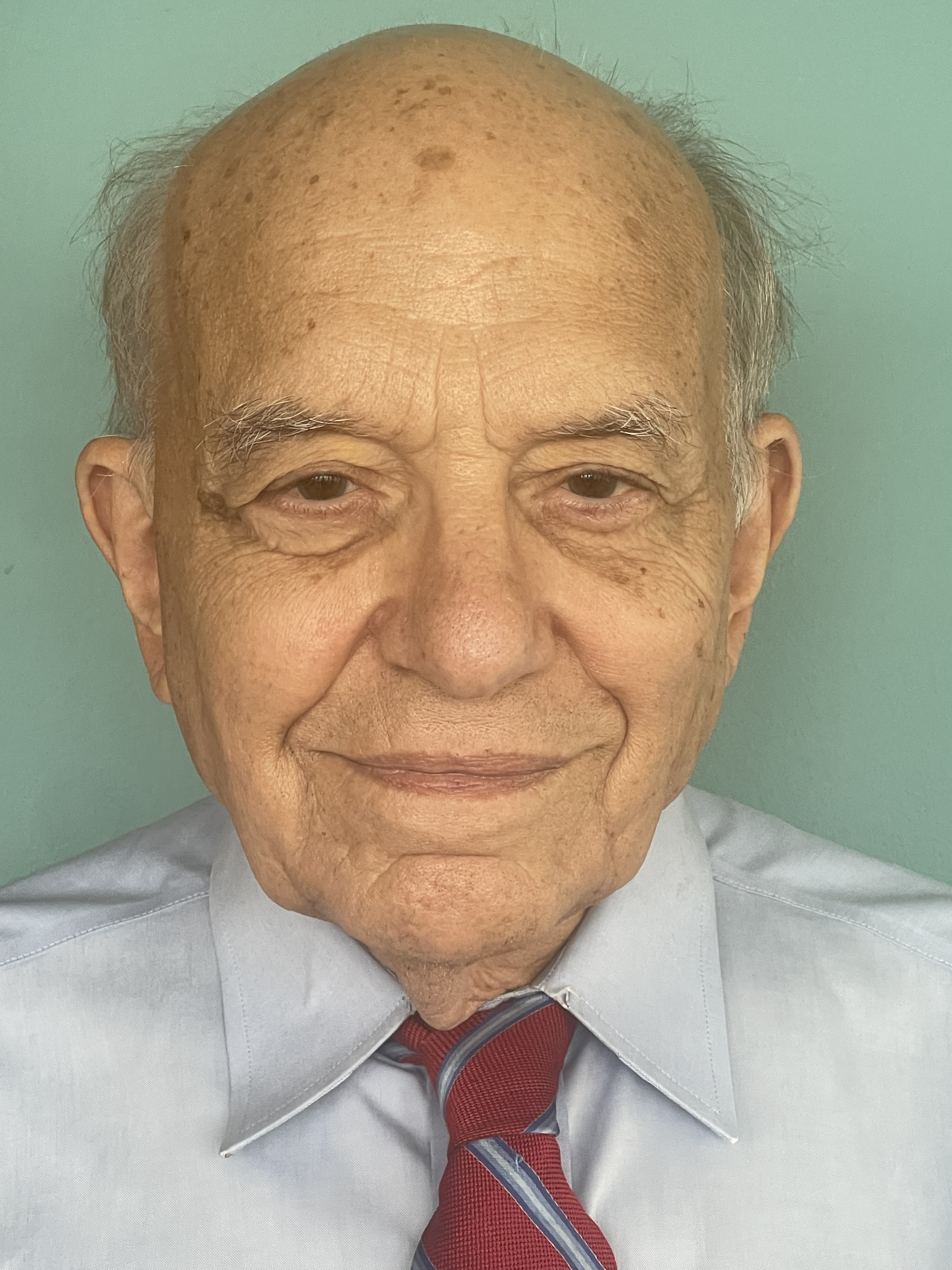
- Born: November 14, 1945 (age 80); Chicago, Illinois, U.S.

Academic background
- Education: Columbia University (BA); Massachusetts Institute of Technology (PhD)
- Influences: Paul Samuelson; Robert Solow

Academic work
- Discipline: Macroeconomics
- Institutions: University of Chicago; University of Pennsylvania
- Notable ideas: Siegel's paradox

Jeremy James Siegel (born November 14, 1945) is an American economist who is the Russell E. Palmer Professor Emeritus of Finance at the Wharton School of the University of Pennsylvania. Siegel's Paradox, relating to the foreign exchange market, is named after him.

Siegel is chief economist at WisdomTree Investments, where he has contributed to the development of fundamental indexing strategies and provides analysis of financial markets and macroeconomic trends. He taught for more than four decades at the Wharton School and is known for his research on long-term stock market returns, the equity risk premium, and historical financial market performance.

== Early life and education ==
Siegel was born in Chicago, Illinois, and graduated from Highland Park High School in 1963. He majored in mathematics and economics at Columbia University, graduating Phi Beta Kappa in 1967 with a Bachelor of Arts (B.A.), summa cum laude. He obtained a Ph.D. in economics from the Massachusetts Institute of Technology (MIT) in 1971. As a graduate student he studied under Nobel Prize winners Paul Samuelson, Robert Solow, Franco Modigliani.

His doctoral dissertation, Stability of a Monetary Economy with Inflationary Expectations, was later abstracted in the Journal of Finance and was a finalist in the Irving Fisher Graduate Monograph Competition in 1974. Following completion of his doctorate, Siegel received a National Science Foundation postdoctoral fellowship and conducted research at Harvard University from 1971 to 1972.

== Career ==
Siegel began his career at the University of Chicago where he served as assistant professor of business economics at the Graduate School of Business from 1972 to 1976. In 1976 he joined the faculty of the Wharton School, where he taught finance and macroeconomics.

Siegel was named the Russell E. Palmer Professor of Finance in 1998 and served on the Wharton faculty for 45 years, from July 1976 until his retirement in June 2021. In 1994 he was named as outstanding Business Professor in a World-wide Ranking conducted by Business Week magazine.

Siegel has also held research and editorial roles within the economics profession. He was a research fellow at the Federal Reserve Bank of Philadelphia during 1990–1991 and served as associate editor of the Journal of Money, Credit and Banking from 1984 to 1995. He has also been a member of the Financial Economics Roundtable, a group of senior financial economists recognized for contributions to the field.

== Research ==
Siegel's research has focused on long-term financial market performance, the equity risk premium, inflation, monetary policy, and asset valuation. His historical analyses of stock and bond returns, including studies such as The Equity Premium, Stock and Bond Returns Since 1802 and The Shrinking Equity Premium, have been widely cited in financial economics. He has also published research on interest rates, inflation, and financial stability, and collaborated with economists Robert J. Shiller and Richard Thaler on studies related to historical interest rates, the Gibson paradox, and behavioral explanations of the equity premium puzzle.

=== Investing advice ===
In his books Stocks for the Long Run (1994 - 2023, 6th Edition) and The Future for Investors (2005), Siegel outlines his investing theories and advice.

He recommends against holding bonds, arguing their long-term performance tends to be negative after inflation. Siegel's position on bonds has been disputed, with critics proposing his data is flawed due to use of unreliable information from earlier sources.

For stocks, Siegel recommends relying primarily or exclusively on index funds when possible, as active management tends to underperform market averages over long periods. (When he wrote in the late 1990s and early 2000s, index funds were not necessarily available in 401k plans but have become more popular since then.) He is not opposed to holding a small portion of the portfolio in single stocks, provided their selection is prudent.

For all stocks or investment options, Siegel advise following a "D-I-V" mnemonic as a guideline: prioritizing dividends, international, and valuation. His research found dividend-paying stocks tend to offer superior long-term performance, as they are associated with profitable mature companies that hold up well during declining markets and recessions, and are also more likely to be reasonably valued. He has endorsed the Dogs of the Dow method, of holding the highest-dividend stocks in the Dow Jones Industrial Average. Siegel recommends substantial international stock holdings, up to 40-50%, to avoid home country bias and obtain a broader variety of options. For valuation, Siegel recommends stocks or indexes that are fairly valued or undervalued while avoiding sectors that are overvalued or trendy, as they tend to offer poor long-term results. He calls this phenomenon the "growth trap" and notes that fast-growing companies, industries or economies are not necessarily good investments.

Siegel's academic research showing dividend-paying companies tend to offer superior long-term performance with lower risk has influenced the construction of indexes used for WisdomTree Investments, a provider of exchange traded funds. After the dot com bubble of the late 1990s and early 2000s Siegel became somewhat skeptical of the prevailing use of market capitalization for constructing index funds, and thus helped develop fundamental indexing.

== TV programs ==
Siegel has appeared regularly on television networks including CNN, CNBC, Bloomberg Television, Fox Business, and PBS’s Nightly Business Report. Siegel is a lifelong friend of Robert Shiller, a Nobel prize winning economist at the Yale School of Management, whom Siegel has known since their MIT graduate school days. Siegel and Shiller have frequently debated each other on TV about the stock market and its future returns, and have become financial media celebrities, regularly appearing on CNBC.

== Criticisms ==
=== IPO debate ===
Siegel has said that Initial Public Offerings, stock sold by new companies, typically disappoint. In his The Future for Investors: Why the Tried and the True Triumph Over the Bold and the New (Crown Business, 2005), Siegel analyzed 9,000 IPOs between 1968 and 2003 and concluded that IPOs consistently underperformed a small-cap index in nearly four out of five cases.

=== 2000 bullishness ===
Siegel has been criticized for bullishness on the stock market in 2000. In a BusinessWeek interview in May 2000 when asked about the stock market, he replied:

"Seven percent per year [average] real returns on stocks is what I find over nearly two centuries. I don't see persuasive reasons why it should be any different from that over the intermediate run. In the short run, it could be almost anything."

That being said, Professor Siegel was correct when he also stated in the same interview:

"I have voiced my concern about the technology sector, and I sometimes advise people to shade down from that sector relative to its percentage in the [Standard & Poor's 500-stock index.] I really am concerned with these companies that have p-e ratios of 90, 100, and above. I still think stocks, as a diversified portfolio, are the best long-run investment. I will say that indexed bonds at 4% are an attractive hedge at the present time. To get a 4% real rate of return, although it's not as high as 6.5% to 7% that we talked about in stocks, as a guaranteed rate of return is certainly comforting against any inflation."

On March 14, 2000, The Wall Street Journal published an opinion piece by Siegel titled: "Big-Cap Tech Stocks Are a Sucker Bet". The piece issued warnings against investing in some of the hottest technology stocks during the dot com bubble.

== Bibliography ==
=== Books ===
- The Future for Investors: Why the Tried and the True Triumph Over the Bold and the New (2005).
- Stocks for the Long Run: The Definitive Guide to Financial Market Returns and Long-Term Investment Strategies, McGraw-Hill (1994 - 2023, 6th Edition), ISBN 0071494707.
- Revolution on Wall Street: The Rise and Decline of the New York Stock Exchange (1993).
- David R. Henderson, ed. (2008). "Stock Market". Concise Encyclopedia of Economics (2nd ed.). Indianapolis: Library of Economics and Liberty. pp. 478–80. ISBN 978-0865976658. OCLC 237794267.

=== Selected academic journal publications ===
- Siegel, Jeremy J. (1972). "Risk, Interest Rates, and the Forward Exchange." Quarterly Journal of Economics. 86 (2): 303–309.
- Siegel, Jeremy J. (1976). "Stability and the Keynesian and Classical Macroeconomic Systems." Journal of Monetary Economics. 2 (2): 257–266.
- Siegel, Jeremy J.; Warner, Jerold B. (1977). "Indexation, the Risk-Free Asset, and Capital Market Equilibrium." Journal of Finance. 32 (4): 1101–1108.
- Siegel, Jeremy J.; Shiller, Robert J. (1977). "The Gibson Paradox and Historical Movements in Real Interest Rates." Journal of Political Economy. 85 (5): 891–907.
- Siegel, Jeremy J.; Santomero, Anthony M. (1981). "Bank Regulation and Macroeconomic Stability." American Economic Review. 71 (1): 39–53.
- Siegel, Jeremy J. (1985). "Money Supply Announcements and Interest Rates: Does Monetary Policy Matter?" Journal of Monetary Economics. 15 (2): 163–176.
- Siegel, Jeremy J. (1992). "The Equity Premium, Stock and Bond Returns Since 1802." Financial Analysts Journal. 48 (1): 28–38.
- Siegel, Jeremy J.; Thaler, Richard H. (1997). "Anomalies: The Equity Premium Puzzle." Journal of Economic Perspectives. 11 (1): 191–200.
- Siegel, Jeremy J. (2003). "What Is an Asset Price Bubble? An Operational Definition." European Financial Management. 9 (1): 11–24.
- Siegel, Jeremy J.; Schwartz, Jeremy (2006). "The Long-Term Returns on the Original S&P 500 Firms." Financial Analysts Journal. 62 (1): 18–31.

== Awards ==
1994: Best Business School Professor in worldwide ranking, Business Week

2002: Lindback Award for outstanding university teaching

1996, 2005: Helen Kardon Moss Anvil Award for outstanding MBA teaching

2005: Nicholas Molodovsky Award by the Chartered Financial Analysts Institute to "those individuals who have made outstanding contributions of such significance as to change the direction of the profession and to raise it to higher standards of accomplishment."
