= WisdomTree Investments =

U.S. ETF and ETP asset manager company

WisdomTree Investments, Inc.
- Type: Public
- Traded as: NYSE: WT; S&P 600 component
- Industry: Investment Management
- Founded: 1985
- Headquarters: New York, New York, U.S.
- Key people: Jonathan Steinberg, CEO and President
- Products: 79 Exchange-Traded Funds (ETFs)
- Revenue: ▲US$494 million (2025)
- Net income: ▲US$109 million (2025)
- AUM: Global $99.5 billion (January 2024)
- Total assets: ▲US$1.51 billion (2025)
- Total equity: ▲US$414 million (2025)
- Number of employees: 204 (July 2018)
- Subsidiaries: Boost ETP
- Website: wisdomtree.com

WisdomTree, Inc. is a global exchange-traded fund (ETF) and exchange-traded product (ETP) sponsor and asset manager with headquarters in New York. WisdomTree launched its first ETFs in June 2006, and became one of the major ETF providers in the United States. WisdomTree sponsors different ETFs that span asset classes and countries worldwide. Categories include: U.S. and International Equity, Currency, Fixed Income and Alternatives.

WisdomTree manages approximately $99.5 billion in assets under management globally, as of January 2024.

WisdomTree’s common stock is listed on the New York Stock Exchange under the ticker WT.

== Company information ==
In 2006, Wisdom Tree launched its first family of dividend weighted ETFs.

WisdomTree's dividend strategy is influenced by Professor Jeremy Siegel's research, which proposes that dividend-paying companies may offer superior long-term performance with lower risk.

As of January 2023, WisdomTree offered 79 different ETFs in the U.S. and 269,349 products in Europe, with over 200+ employees worldwide across the U.S., Europe, South America and Israel.

== History ==
WisdomTree, Inc. was incorporated by its chief executive officer and founder, Jonathan Steinberg, in Delaware as Financial Data Systems, Inc., on September 19, 1985. The company was inactive until October 1988 when it acquired the assets relating to what would become Individual Investor magazine, a monthly personal finance magazine.

In December 1991, it completed an initial public offering and commenced trading on the Nasdaq Stock Market (NASDAQ). In 1993, the company's name was changed to Individual Investor Group, Inc. and throughout the 1990s it was a financial media company that published several magazines, including Individual Investor and Ticker, newsletters, as well as maintaining several online financial related websites. In addition, the company also began developing stock indexes.

In 2002, the company's name was changed to Index Development Partners, Inc., and Jonathan Steinberg, along with Rayne Steinberg and Luciano Siracusano, continued development of the concepts for the company's fundamentally weighted index methodology. While this concept was being developed, the company sought to obtain financing to recapitalize and become an ETF sponsor.

Between 2004 and 2005, the company obtained financing from a core group of investors including former hedge fund manager Michael Steinhardt, Professor Jeremy Siegel of The Wharton School of the University of Pennsylvania and James D Robinson IV with venture capital firm of RRE Ventures. Michael Steinhardt became Chairman and Professor Jeremy Siegel became the senior investment strategy advisor for the company.

On September 21, 2005, the company's name was changed to WisdomTree Investments, Inc. WisdomTree Investments, Inc. launched its first 20 ETFs in June 2006. On July 26, 2011, WisdomTree listed on the NASDAQ Global Select Market under the ticker: WETF.

In 2014, WisdomTree acquired a majority stake (75%) in London-based Boost ETP. The same year, it was reported that WisdomTree was going to invest $20 million in Boost to give it working capital to build out its European business.

In 2016, the company was included on Forbes' list of America's 50 Most Trustworthy Financial Companies. In 2019, it was reported by Bloomberg News that WisdomTree Investments was considering selling the company to J.P. Morgan Chase in 2018, however, the two companies failed to reach a mutually acceptable price.

WisdomTree has been expanding into other digital assets, such as the launch of cryptocurrency ETPs in Europe, which are listed on the Swiss stock exchange. Other digital assets initiatives include WisdomTree’s Enhanced Commodity Strategy Fund (GCC), the first ETF to provide exposure to bitcoin futures, WisdomTree’s second investment in blockchain-based infrastructure provider Securrency Inc. and products like WisdomTree Crypto Mega Cap Equal Weight ETP, which is backed by physical assets including cryptocurrencies, as well as WisdomTree Crypto Market (BLOC) and WisdomTree Crypto Altcoins (WALT).

In early 2022 ETFS Capital Limited, WisdomTree's largest single shareholder with a 10.5% stake, tried to take a seat on the board of WisdomTree. According to a 13D regulatory filing with the SEC from January 2022, ETFS Capital chairman Graham Tuckwell described what he saw as the underperformance of WisdomTree and said the company had “been unwilling to date to work constructively” toward giving him a seat on the board since discussions began. A March 8, 2022 13D filing disclosed that another WisdomTree investor, Lion Point Capital, supported ETFS Capital’s efforts to take a seat on the board. The filing revealed ETFS Capital and Lion Point Capital had entered into a Group Agreement to “seek changes to the composition of the board and management” of WisdomTree, with the intention to “work constructively with the issuer to arrive at a solution that puts the issuer in the best position to unlock value for the benefit of all stockholders”.

In a regulatory filing from March 14, 2022, WisdomTree issued a ‘poison pill’, officially known as a shareholder rights agreement, to prevents any investor from acquiring more than 10% of the common stock in the company until the day after the company’s annual general meeting in June or potentially until March 2023 if extended by a shareholder vote.

In March, 2022, a WisdomTree was forced to redeem all shares of 3NIS, a leveraged ETP that moved inverse nickel prices. Due to a major short squeeze for the commodity, nickel prices shot up 250% in a few days and the ETF's daily price dropped below zero. A statement from WisdomTree said "Investors should not expect to get paid for the securities they hold."

In May 2022, WisdomTree reached an agreement with ETFS Capital and Lion Point Capital. As part of the settlement agreement, WisdomTree expanded its Board of Directors from seven to nine directors and appointed two independent directors. In addition, WisdomTree terminated the ‘poison pill’ that had been issued in March 2022 and announced that the company would seek stockholder approval to declassify its Board of Directors at the 2022 Annual Meeting of stockholders.

In October 2022, WisdomTree announced the transfer of the listing of its common stock to the New York Stock Exchange (NYSE) from The Nasdaq Global Select Market (Nasdaq). WisdomTree also announced changing its corporate name from WisdomTree Investments, Inc. to WisdomTree, Inc. effective November 7, 2022. WisdomTree common stock began trading on the NYSE at market open on November 7, 2022, under the new ticker symbol “WT”.

In April 2023, ETFS Capital Limited announced its nomination of three candidates to WisdomTree’s Board of Directors. At WisdomTree’s 2023 Annual Meeting of Stockholders held on June 16, 2023, five of six WisdomTree nominees were elected, based on a preliminary vote count, with ETFS Capital Limited nominee Tonia Pankopf elected to replace WisdomTree chairman Frank Salerno. Stockholders also voted for WisdomTree’s proposals on say-on-pay, the ratification of the stockholder rights agreement and the firm’s accountant.

== Key financial statistics ==
Year ending	Assets under management	Revenue
31 December 2006	$1.52 billion	$2.2 million
31 December 2007	$4.56 billion	$20.9 million
31 December 2008	$3.18 billion	$23.6 million
31 December 2009	$5.98 billion	$22.1 million
31 December 2010	$9.89 billion	$41.6 million
31 December 2011	$12.18 billion	$65.2 million
31 December 2012	$18.30 billion	$84.8 million
31 December 2013	$34.90 billion	$149.5 million
31 December 2014	$39.30 billion	$183.8 million
31 December 2015	$51.60 billion	$298.9 million
31 December 2016	$40.20 billion	$219.4 million
31 December 2017	$46.80 billion	$237.4 million
31 December 2018	$35.50 billion	$274.1 million
31 December 2019	$63.60 billion	$268.4 million
31 December 2020	$67.40 billion	$253.7 million
31 December 2021	$77.50 billion	$304.3 million
31 December 2022	$82.00 billion	$301.3 million

== See also ==
- AdvisorShares
- Ark Invest
- IShares
- PowerShares
- ETF Securities
