= Boy or girl paradox =

Paradox in probability theory

The boy or girl paradox surrounds a set of questions in probability theory, which are also known as the two children problem, Mr. Smith's children and the Mrs. Smith problem. The initial formulation of the question dates back to at least 1959, when Martin Gardner featured it in his May 1959 "Mathematical Games column" in Scientific American. He phrased the paradox as follows:

- Mr. Jones has two children. The older child is a girl. What is the probability that both children are girls?
- Mr. Smith has two children. At least one of them is a boy. What is the probability that both children are boys?

Gardner initially gave the answers 1/2 and 1/3, respectively, but later acknowledged that the second question was ambiguous. Its answer could be 1/2, depending on the procedure by which the information "at least one of them is a boy" was obtained. The ambiguity, depending on the exact wording and possible assumptions, was confirmed by Maya Bar-Hillel and Ruma Falk, and Raymond S. Nickerson.

Other variants of this question, with varying degrees of ambiguity, have been popularized by Ask Marilyn in Parade Magazine, John Tierney of The New York Times, and Leonard Mlodinow in The Drunkard's Walk. One scientific study showed that when identical information was conveyed, but with different partially ambiguous wordings that emphasized different points, the percentage of MBA students who answered 1/2 changed from 85% to 39%.

The paradox has stimulated a great deal of controversy. The paradox stems from whether the problem setup is similar for the two questions. The intuitive answer is 1/2. This answer is intuitive if the question leads the reader to believe that there are two equally likely possibilities for the sex of the second child (i.e., boy and girl), and that the probability of these outcomes is absolute, not conditional.

The two interpretations of the second part are shown in 2a and 2b, the probability in each case being the fraction of the shaded cell to the outlined ones.

== Common assumptions ==
First, it is assumed that the space of all possible events can be easily enumerated, providing an extensional definition of outcomes: {BB, BG, GB, GG}. This notation indicates that there are four possible combinations of children, labeling boys B and girls G, and using the first letter to represent the older child. Second, it is assumed that these outcomes are equally probable. This implies the following model, a Bernoulli process with p = 1/2:

1. Each child is either male or female.
2. Each child has the same chance of being male as of being female.
3. The sex of each child is independent of the sex of the other.

== First question ==
- Mr. Jones has two children. The older child is a girl. What is the probability that both children are girls?

Under the aforementioned assumptions, in this problem, a random family is selected. In this sample space, there are four equally probable events:

| Older child | Younger child |
|---|---|
| Girl | Girl |
| Girl | Boy |
| ~~Boy~~ | ~~Girl~~ |
| ~~Boy~~ | ~~Boy~~ |

Only two of these possible events meet the criteria specified in the question (i.e., GG, GB). Since both of the two possibilities in the new sample space {GG, GB} are equally likely, and only one of the two, GG, includes two girls, the probability that the younger child is also a girl is 1/2.

== Second question ==
- Mr. Smith has two children. At least one of them is a boy. What is the probability that both children are boys?

This question is identical to question one, except that instead of specifying that the older child is a girl, it is specified that at least one of them is a boy. In response to reader criticism of the question posed in 1959, Gardner said that no answer is possible without information that was not provided. Specifically, that two different procedures for determining that "at least one is a boy" could lead to the exact same wording of the problem. But they lead to different correct answers:

- From all families with two children, at least one of whom is a boy, a family is chosen at random. This would yield the answer of 1/3.
- From all families with two children, one child is selected at random, and the sex of that child is specified to be a boy. This would yield an answer of 1/2.

Grinstead and Snell argue that the question is ambiguous in much the same way Gardner did. They leave it to the reader to decide whether the procedure, that yields 1/3 as the answer, is reasonable for the problem as stated above. The formulation of the question they were considering specifically is the following:

- Consider a family with two children. Given that one of the children is a boy, what is the probability that both children are boys?

In this formulation the ambiguity is most obviously present, because it is not clear whether we are allowed to assume that a specific child is a boy, leaving the other child uncertain, or whether it should be interpreted in the same way as "at least one boy". This ambiguity leaves multiple possibilities that are not equivalent and leaves the necessity to make assumptions about how the information was obtained, as Bar-Hillel and Falk argue, where different assumptions can lead to different outcomes (because the problem statement was not well enough defined to allow a single straightforward interpretation and answer).

For example, say an observer sees Mr. Smith on a walk with just one of his children. If he has two boys then that child must be a boy. But if he has a boy and a girl, that child could have been a girl. So seeing him with a boy eliminates not only the combinations where he has two girls, but also the combinations where he has a son and a daughter and chooses the daughter to walk with.

So, while it is certainly true that every possible Mr. Smith has at least one boy (i.e., the condition is necessary), it cannot be assumed that every Mr. Smith with at least one boy is intended. That is, the problem statement does not say that having a boy is a sufficient condition for Mr. Smith to be identified as having a boy this way.

Commenting on Gardner's version of the problem, Bar-Hillel and Falk note that "Mr. Smith, unlike the reader, is presumably aware of the sex of both of his children when making this statement", i.e. that "I have two children and at least one of them is a boy." It must be further assumed that Mr. Smith would always report this fact if it were true, and either remain silent or say he has at least one daughter, for the correct answer to be 1/3 as Gardner apparently originally intended. But under that assumption, if he remains silent or says he has a daughter, there is a 100% probability he has two daughters.

== Analysis of the ambiguity ==
If it is assumed that this information was obtained by looking at both children to see if there is at least one boy, the condition is both necessary and sufficient. Three of the four equally probable events for a two-child family in the sample space above meet the condition, as in this table:

| Older child | Younger child |
|---|---|
| ~~Girl~~ | ~~Girl~~ |
| Girl | Boy |
| Boy | Girl |
| Boy | Boy |

Thus, if it is assumed that both children were considered while looking for a boy, the answer to question 2 is 1/3. However, if the family was first selected and then a random, true statement was made about the sex of one child in that family, whether or not both were considered, the correct way to calculate the conditional probability is not to count all of the cases that include a child with that sex. Instead, one must consider only the probabilities where the statement will be made in each case. So, if ALOB represents the event where the statement is "at least one boy", and ALOG represents the event where the statement is "at least one girl", then this table describes the sample space:

| Older child | Younger child | P(this family) | P(ALOB given this family) | P(ALOG given this family) | P(ALOB and this family) | P(ALOG and this family) |
|---|---|---|---|---|---|---|
| Girl | Girl | 1/4 | 0 | 1 | 0 | 1/4 |
| Girl | Boy | 1/4 | 1/2 | 1/2 | 1/8 | 1/8 |
| Boy | Girl | 1/4 | 1/2 | 1/2 | 1/8 | 1/8 |
| Boy | Boy | 1/4 | 1 | 0 | 1/4 | 0 |

So, if at least one is a boy when the fact is chosen randomly, the probability that both are boys is
$$\mathrm{\frac{P(ALOB\text{ and }BB)}{P(ALOB)}} = \frac{\frac14}{0+\frac18+\frac18+\frac14} = \frac12 \,.$$

The paradox occurs when it is not known how the statement "at least one is a boy" was generated. Either answer could be correct, based on what is assumed.

However, the "1/3" answer is obtained only by assuming P(ALOB | BG) = P(ALOB | GB) = 1, which implies P(ALOG | BG) = P(ALOG | GB) = 0, that is, the other child's sex is never mentioned although it is present. As Marks and Smith say, "This extreme assumption is never included in the presentation of the two-child problem, however, and is surely not what people have in mind when they present it."

=== Unambiguous reframing ===
Logicians and decision theorists note that this ambiguity can be resolved by specifying the sampling protocol directly within the problem statement (Bar-Hillel & Falk 1982; Smith 2010). The traditional wording ("Mr. Smith has two children. At least one of them is a boy") is structurally misleading: it presents information as a post-selection revelation about an individual family, whereas the 1/3 calculation strictly requires that "at least one boy" was the prior selection filter used to construct the sample pool.

This conflict is resolved by reframing the question to state the population criteria prior to selection:

- Mr. Smith is selected at random from a population of two-child households where every household has at least one boy. What is the probability that both children are boys?

When framed as an explicit selection constraint on the population, female-only households are excluded prior to sampling, making the set-theoretic probability of 1/3 mathematically unambiguous. Contrasting these two formulations demonstrates that the scenario functions as a counterintuitive paradox only because the standard wording misleads listeners into interpreting a prior population filter as an un-modeled observational report.

== Modelling the generative process ==
Another way to analyse the ambiguity (for question 2) is by making explicit the generative process (all draws are independent).

- The following process leads to answer $\mathrm{P}(c_1=c_2=\mathrm{B} \mid \mathrm{Observation})=\frac{1}{3}$ :
  - Draw $c_1$ equiprobably from $\mathrm{\{B,G\}}$
  - Draw $c_2$ equiprobably from $\mathrm{\{B,G\}}$
  - Discard cases where there is no B
  - Observe $c_1=\mathrm{B} \lor c_2=\mathrm{B}$
- The following process leads to answer $\mathrm{P}(c_1=c_2=\mathrm{B} \mid \mathrm{Observation})=\frac{1}{2}$ :
  - Draw $c_1$ equiprobably from $\mathrm{\{B,G\}}$
  - Draw $c_2$ equiprobably from $\mathrm{\{B,G\}}$
  - Draw index $i$ equiprobably from $\{1,2\}$
  - Observe $c_i=\mathrm{B}$

== Bayesian analysis ==
Following classical probability arguments, we consider a large urn containing two children. We assume equal probability that either is a boy or a girl. The three discernible cases are thus:

1. both are girls (GG) – with probability P(GG) = 1/4,
2. both are boys (BB) – with probability of P(BB) = 1/4, and
3. one of each (G·B) – with probability of P(G·B) = 1/2.

These are the prior probabilities.

Now we add the additional assumption that "at least one is a boy" = B. Using Bayes' Theorem, we find

$$\mathrm{P(BB \mid B)} = \mathrm{P(B \mid BB) \times \frac{P(BB)}{P(B)}} = 1 \times \frac{\left(\frac14\right)}{\left(\frac34\right)} = \frac13 \,.$$

where P(A|B) means "probability of A given B". P(B|BB) = probability of at least one boy given both are boys = 1. P(BB) = probability of both boys = 1/4 from the prior distribution. P(B) = probability of at least one being a boy, which includes cases BB and G·B = 1/4 + 1/2 = 3/4.

Note that, although the natural assumption seems to be a probability of 1/2, so the derived value of 1/3 seems low, the actual "normal" value for P(BB) is 1/4, so the 1/3 is actually a bit higher.

The paradox arises because the second assumption is somewhat artificial, and when describing the problem in an actual setting things get a bit sticky. Just how do we know that "at least" one is a boy? One description of the problem states that we look into a window, see only one child and it is a boy. This sounds like the same assumption. However, this one is equivalent to "sampling" the distribution (i.e. removing one child from the urn, ascertaining that it is a boy, then replacing). Let's call the statement "the sample is a boy" proposition "b". Now we have:

$$\mathrm{P(BB \mid b)} = \mathrm{P(b \mid BB) \times \frac{P(BB)}{P(b)}} = 1 \times \frac{\left(\frac14\right)}{\left(\frac12\right)} = \frac12 \,.$$

The difference here is the P(b), which is just the probability of drawing a boy from all possible cases (i.e. without the "at least"), which is clearly 1/2.

The Bayesian analysis generalizes easily to the case in which we relax the 50:50 population assumption. If we have no information about the populations then we assume a "flat prior", i.e. P(GG) = P(BB) = P(G·B) = 1/3. In this case the "at least" assumption produces the result P(BB|B) = 1/2, and the sampling assumption produces P(BB|b) = 2/3, a result also derivable from the Rule of Succession.

== Variants of the question ==
Following the popularization of the paradox by Gardner it has been presented and discussed in various forms. The first variant presented by Bar-Hillel & Falk is worded as follows:

- Mr. Smith is the father of two. We meet him walking along the street with a young boy whom he proudly introduces as his son. What is the probability that Mr. Smith's other child is also a boy?

Bar-Hillel & Falk use this variant to highlight the importance of considering the underlying assumptions. The intuitive answer is 1/2 and, when making the most natural assumptions, this is correct. However, someone may argue that "...before Mr. Smith identifies the boy as his son, we know only that he is either the father of two boys, BB, or of two girls, GG, or of one of each in either birth order, i.e., BG or GB. Assuming again independence and equiprobability, we begin with a probability of 1/4 that Smith is the father of two boys. Discovering that he has at least one boy rules out the event GG. Since the remaining three events were equiprobable, we obtain a probability of 1/3 for BB."

The natural assumption is that Mr. Smith selected the child companion at random. If so, as combination BB has twice the probability of either BG or GB of having resulted in the boy walking companion (and combination GG has zero probability, ruling it out), the union of events BG and GB becomes equiprobable with event BB, and so the chance that the other child is also a boy is 1/2. Bar-Hillel & Falk, however, suggest an alternative scenario. They imagine a culture in which boys are invariably chosen over girls as walking companions. In this case, the combinations of BB, BG and GB are assumed equally likely to have resulted in the boy walking companion, and thus the probability that the other child is also a boy is 1/3.

In 1991, Marilyn vos Savant responded to a reader who asked her to answer a variant of the Boy or Girl paradox that included beagles. In 1996, she published the question again in a different form. The 1991 and 1996 questions, respectively were phrased:

- A shopkeeper says she has two new baby beagles to show you, but she doesn't know whether they're male, female, or a pair. You tell her that you want only a male, and she telephones the fellow who's giving them a bath. "Is at least one a male?" she asks him. "Yes!" she informs you with a smile. What is the probability that the other one is a male?
- Say that a woman and a man (who are unrelated) each have two children. We know that at least one of the woman's children is a boy and that the man's oldest child is a boy. Can you explain why the chances that the woman has two boys do not equal the chances that the man has two boys?

With regard to the second formulation Vos Savant gave the classic answer that the chances that the woman has two boys are about 1/3 whereas the chances that the man has two boys are about 1/2. In response to reader response that questioned her analysis vos Savant conducted a survey of readers with exactly two children, at least one of which is a boy. Of 17,946 responses, 35.9% reported two boys.

Vos Savant's articles were discussed by Carlton and Stansfield in a 2005 article in The American Statistician. The authors do not discuss the possible ambiguity in the question and conclude that her answer is correct from a mathematical perspective, given the assumptions that the likelihood of a child being a boy or girl is equal, and that the sex of the second child is independent of the first. With regard to her survey they say it "at least validates vos Savant's correct assertion that the "chances" posed in the original question, though similar-sounding, are different, and that the first probability is certainly nearer to 1 in 3 than to 1 in 2."

Carlton and Stansfield go on to discuss the common assumptions in the Boy or Girl paradox. They demonstrate that in reality male children are actually more likely than female children, and that the sex of the second child is not independent of the sex of the first. The authors conclude that, although the assumptions of the question run counter to observations, the paradox still has pedagogical value, since it "illustrates one of the more intriguing applications of conditional probability." Of course, the actual probability values do not matter; the purpose of the paradox is to demonstrate seemingly contradictory logic, not actual birth rates.

=== Information about the child ===
Suppose we were told not only that Mr. Smith has two children, and one of them is a boy, but also that the boy was born on a Tuesday: does this change the previous analyses? Again, the answer depends on how this information was presented – what kind of selection process produced this knowledge.

Following the tradition of the problem, suppose that in the population of two-child families, the sex of the two children is independent of one another, equally likely boy or girl, and that the birth day of each child is independent both the child's gender and of the birth day other child. Assuming a child is equally likely to be born on each day of the week, the chance of being born on any given day is 1/7, but the discussion below will derive a general solution applicable to any assumed probability distribution over the days of the week.

From Bayes' Theorem, the probability of having two boys given that one boy was born on a Tuesday is

$$\mathrm{P(BB \mid B_T) = \frac{P(B_T \mid BB) \times P(BB)}{P(B_T)}}$$.

Let $p$ be the probability of being born on a Tuesday is, and we will set $p = 1/7$ after arriving at the general solution. The second factor in the numerator is simply 1/4, the probability of having two boys. The first term in the numerator is the probability of at least one boy born on Tuesday given that the family has two boys, which is $1 - (1 - p)^2$ (one minus the probability that neither boy is born on Tuesday). For the denominator, we decompose using the law of total probability:

$$\mathrm{P(B_T) = P(B_T \mid GG) P(GG) + P(B_T \mid BG) P(BG) + P(B_T \mid GB) P(GB) + P(B_T \mid BB) P(BB)}.$$

Our assumptions and the genders of the two children imply that $\mathrm{P(BB) = P(BG) = P(GB) = P(GG) = 1/4}$. We know that $\mathrm{P(B_T \mid GG)} = 0$, and $\mathrm{P(B_T \mid BB)}$ we determined in the preceding paragraph. In the cases where there is exactly one boy, that boy has probability $p$ of being born on Tuesday, so $\mathrm{P(B_T \mid BG) = P(B_T \mid GB)} = p$. Therefore, the conditional probability is:

$$\mathrm{P(BB \mid B_{T})} = \frac{(1-(1-p)^2) \times \frac{1}{4}}{0 + \frac{1}{4} p + \frac{1}{4} p + \frac{1}{4} (1-(1-p)^2)} = \frac{1-(1-p)^2}{2p + (1-(1-p)^2)} = \frac{2p-p^2}{4p-p^2}.$$

For $p > 0$, this reduces to

$$\mathrm{P(BB \mid B_{T})} = \frac{2 - p}{4 - p}$$.

If $p$ is now set to 1/7, the probability becomes 13/27, or about 0.48. In fact, as $p$ approaches 0, the total probability goes to 1/2, which is the answer expected when one child is sampled (e.g. the oldest child is a boy) and is thus removed from the pool of possible children. In other words, as more and more details about the boy child are given (for instance: born on January 1), the chance that the other child is a girl approaches one half.

It seems that quite irrelevant information was introduced, yet the probability of the sex of the other child has changed dramatically from what it was before (the chance the other child was a girl was 2/3, when it was not known that the boy was born on Tuesday).

To understand why this is, imagine Marilyn vos Savant's poll of readers had asked which day of the week boys in the family were born. If Marilyn then divided the whole data set into seven groups – one for each day of the week a son was born – six out of seven families with two boys would be counted in two groups (the group for the day of the week of birth boy 1, and the group of the day of the week of birth for boy 2), doubling, in every group, the probability of a boy-boy combination.

== Psychological investigation ==
From the position of statistical analysis the relevant question is often ambiguous and as such there is no "correct" answer. However, this does not exhaust the boy or girl paradox for it is not necessarily the ambiguity that explains how the intuitive probability is derived. A survey such as vos Savant's suggests that the majority of people adopt an understanding of Gardner's problem that if they were consistent would lead them to the 1/3 probability answer but overwhelmingly people intuitively arrive at the 1/2 probability answer. Ambiguity notwithstanding, this makes the problem of interest to psychological researchers who seek to understand how humans estimate probability.

Fox & Levav (2004) used the problem (called the Mr. Smith problem, credited to Gardner, but not worded exactly the same as Gardner's version) to test theories of how people estimate conditional probabilities. In this study, the paradox was posed to participants in two ways:

- "Mr. Smith says: 'I have two children and at least one of them is a boy.' Given this information, what is the probability that the other child is a boy?"
- "Mr. Smith says: 'I have two children and it is not the case that they are both girls.' Given this information, what is the probability that both children are boys?"

The authors argue that the first formulation gives the reader the mistaken impression that there are two possible outcomes for the "other child", whereas the second formulation gives the reader the impression that there are four possible outcomes, of which one has been rejected (resulting in 1/3 being the probability of both children being boys, as there are 3 remaining possible outcomes, only one of which is that both of the children are boys). The study found that 85% of participants answered 1/2 for the first formulation, while only 39% responded that way to the second formulation. The authors argued that the reason people respond differently to each question (along with other similar problems, such as the Monty Hall Problem and the Bertrand's box paradox) is because of the use of naive heuristics that fail to properly define the number of possible outcomes.

== See also ==
- Bertrand paradox (probability)
- Necktie paradox
- Sleeping Beauty problem
- St. Petersburg paradox
- Two envelopes problem
- List of paradoxes
