= The American Statistician =

- Discipline: Statistics
- Language: English
- Edited by: Minge Xie

Publication details
- History: 1947-present
- Publisher: Taylor & Francis on behalf of the American Statistical Association (United States)
- Frequency: Quarterly
- Impact factor: 2.1 (2024)

Standard abbreviations
- ISO 4: Am. Stat.
- MathSciNet: Amer. Statist.

Indexing
- ISSN: 0003-1305 (print); 1537-2731 (web)
- LCCN: 59028624
- JSTOR: 00031305
- OCLC no.: 1480867

Links
- Journal homepage; Online archive; Online archive

The American Statistician is a quarterly peer-reviewed scientific journal covering statistics published by Taylor & Francis on behalf of the American Statistical Association. It was established in 1947. The editor-in-chief is Minge Xie, a professor at the Rutgers University.
