= Two envelopes problem =

Puzzle in logic and mathematics

The problem concerns two envelopes, each containing an unknown amount of money.

The two envelopes problem, also known as the exchange paradox, is a paradox in probability theory. It is of special interest in decision theory and for the Bayesian interpretation of probability theory. It is a variant of an older problem known as the necktie paradox. The problem is typically introduced by formulating a hypothetical challenge like the following example:

Imagine you are given two identical envelopes, each containing money. One contains twice as much as the other. You may pick one envelope and keep the money it contains. Having chosen an envelope at will, but before inspecting it, you are given the chance to switch envelopes. Should you switch?

Since the situation is symmetric, it seems obvious that there is no point in switching envelopes. On the other hand, a simple calculation using expected values suggests the opposite conclusion, that it is always beneficial to swap envelopes, since the person stands to gain twice as much money if they switch, while the only risk is halving what they currently have.

== Introduction ==
=== Problem ===
A person is given two indistinguishable envelopes, each of which contains a sum of money. One envelope contains twice as much as the other. The person may pick one envelope and keep whatever amount it contains. They pick one envelope at random but before they open it they are given the chance to take the other envelope instead.

=== The switching argument ===
Now suppose the person reasons as follows:

1. Denote by A the amount in the player's selected envelope.
2. The probability that A is the smaller amount is 1/2, and that it is the larger amount is also 1/2.
3. The other envelope may contain either 2A or A/2.
4. If A is the smaller amount, then the other envelope contains 2A.
5. If A is the larger amount, then the other envelope contains A/2.
6. Thus the other envelope contains 2A with probability 1/2 and A/2 with probability 1/2.
7. So the expected value of the money in the other envelope is
  $${1 \over 2} (2A) + {1 \over 2} \left({A \over 2}\right) = {5 \over 4}A$$
8. Since $\tfrac54 A > A$, switching appears to increase the expected amount.

By this mistaken reasoning (explained below), the person should switch.

== History of the paradox ==
The envelope paradox dates back at least to 1943, when Belgian mathematician Maurice Kraitchik proposed a puzzle in his book Recreational Mathematics concerning two men who meet and compare their fine neckties. Each of them knows what his own necktie is worth and agrees for the winner to give his necktie to the loser as consolation. Kraitchik also discusses a variant in which the two men compare the contents of their purses. He assumes that each purse is equally likely to contain 1 up to some large number x of pennies, the total number of pennies minted to date.

The puzzle is also mentioned in a 1953 book on elementary mathematics and mathematical puzzles by the mathematician John Edensor Littlewood, who credited it to the physicist Erwin Schrödinger, where it concerns a pack of cards, each card has two numbers written on it, the player gets to see a random side of a random card, and the question is whether one should turn over the card. Littlewood's pack of cards is infinitely large and his paradox is a paradox of improper prior distributions.

Martin Gardner first wrote about the necktie paradox in his January 1958 column of Mathematical Games. He later popularized Kraitchik's puzzle in his 1982 book Aha! Gotcha, in the form of a wallet game:

Two people, equally rich, meet to compare the contents of their wallets. Each is ignorant of the contents of the two wallets. The game is as follows: whoever has the least money receives the contents of the wallet of the other (in the case where the amounts are equal, nothing happens). One of the two men can reason: "I have the amount A in my wallet. That's the maximum that I could lose. If I win (probability 0.5), the amount that I'll have in my possession at the end of the game will be more than 2A. Therefore the game is favourable to me." The other man can reason in exactly the same way. In fact, by symmetry, the game is fair. Where is the mistake in the reasoning of each man?

— Martin Gardner, Aha! Gotcha

Gardner confessed that though, like Kraitchik, he could give a sound analysis leading to the right answer (there is no point in switching), he could not clearly put his finger on what was wrong with the reasoning for switching, and Kraitchik did not give any help in this direction, either.

In 1988 and 1989, Barry Nalebuff presented two different two-envelope problems, each with one envelope containing twice what is in the other, and each with computation of the expectation value 5A/4. The first paper just presents the two problems. The second discusses many solutions to both of them. The second of his two problems is nowadays the more common, and is presented in this article. According to this version, the two envelopes are filled first, then one is chosen at random and called Envelope A. Martin Gardner independently mentioned this same version in his 1989 book Penrose Tiles to Trapdoor Ciphers and the Return of Dr Matrix. Barry Nalebuff's asymmetric variant, often known as the Ali Baba problem, has one envelope filled first, called Envelope A, and given to Ali. Then a fair coin is tossed to decide whether Envelope B should contain half or twice that amount, and only then given to Baba.

Broome in 1995 called a probability distribution 'paradoxical' if for any given first-envelope amount x, the expectation of the other envelope conditional on x is greater than x. The literature contains dozens of commentaries on the problem, much of which observes that a distribution of finite values can have an infinite expected value.

== Multiplicity of proposed solutions ==
There have been many solutions proposed, and commonly one writer proposes a solution to the problem as stated, after which another writer shows that altering the problem slightly revives the paradox. Such sequences of discussions have produced a family of closely related formulations of the problem, resulting in voluminous literature on the subject.

No proposed solution is widely accepted as definitive. Despite this, it is common for authors to claim that the solution to the problem is easy, even elementary. Upon investigating these elementary solutions, however, they often differ from one author to the next.

=== Example resolution ===
Below is one simple resolution among several that have been proposed.

The switching argument is not valid as stated because the symbol A is used inconsistently. It denotes both (i) the unconditional random variable representing the amount in the chosen envelope and (ii) the amount conditioned on whether that envelope contains the smaller or the larger of the two values. These conditional expectations generally differ and cannot be combined in a single expected value calculation.

The switching argument effectively writes
$$E(B)=\tfrac12 E(2A)+\tfrac12 E(A/2),$$
treating A as the same quantity in both cases. A correct formulation keeps the conditioning explicit:
$$\begin{aligned}
E(B) &= \tfrac12\bigl(E(B\mid B>A)+E(B\mid B<A)\bigr) \\
&= \tfrac12\bigl(E(2A\mid B>A)+E(A/2\mid B<A)\bigr).
\end{aligned}$$
These conditional expectations are not the unconditional quantities $E(2A)$ and $E(A/2)$.

If the envelope amounts are fixed as $x$ and $2x$, with uncertainty only about which envelope was chosen, then $E(2A \mid B > A) = 2x$ and $E(A/2\mid B < A) = x$, and so
$$E(A)=E(B)=\tfrac12(x+2x)=\tfrac32x,$$
so switching has no expected value advantage.

=== Nalebuff asymmetric variant ===
The mechanism by which the amounts of the two envelopes are determined is crucial for the decision of the player to switch her envelope. Suppose that the amounts in the two envelopes A and B were not determined by first fixing the contents of two envelopes E1 and E2, and then naming them A and B at random (for instance, by the toss of a fair coin). Instead, we start right at the beginning by putting some amount in envelope A and then fill B in a way which depends both on chance (the toss of a coin) and on what we put in A. Suppose that first of all the amount a in envelope A is fixed in some way or other, and then the amount in Envelope B is fixed, dependent on what is already in A, according to the outcome of a fair coin. If the coin fell Heads then 2a is put in Envelope B, if the coin fell Tails then a/2 is put in Envelope B. If the player was aware of this mechanism, and knows that she holds Envelope A, but does not know the outcome of the coin toss, and does not know a, then the switching argument is correct and she is recommended to switch envelopes. This version of the problem was introduced by Nalebuff (1988) and is often called the Ali-Baba problem. Notice that there is no need to look in envelope A in order to decide whether or not to switch.

Many more variants of the problem have been introduced. Nickerson and Falk systematically survey a total of 8.

== Bayesian resolutions ==
The simple resolution above assumed that the person who invented the argument for switching was trying to calculate the expectation value of the amount in Envelope A, thinking of the two amounts in the envelopes as fixed (x and 2x). The only uncertainty is which envelope has the smaller amount x. However, many mathematicians and statisticians interpret the argument as an attempt to calculate the expected amount in Envelope B, given a real or hypothetical amount "A" in Envelope A. One does not need to look in the envelope to see how much is in there, in order to do the calculation. If the result of the calculation is an advice to switch envelopes, whatever amount might be in there, then it would appear that one should switch anyway, without looking. In this case, at Steps 6, 7 and 8 of the reasoning, "A" is any fixed possible value of the amount of money in the first envelope.

This interpretation of the two envelopes problem appears in the first publications in which the paradox was introduced in its present-day form, Gardner (1989) and Nalebuff (1988).) It is common in the more mathematical literature on the problem. It also applies to the modification of the problem (which seems to have started with Nalebuff) in which the owner of envelope A does actually look in his envelope before deciding whether or not to switch; though Nalebuff does also emphasize that there is no need to have the owner of envelope A look in his envelope. If he imagines looking in it, and if for any amount which he can imagine being in there, he has an argument to switch, then he will decide to switch anyway. Finally, this interpretation was also the core of earlier versions of the two envelopes problem (Littlewood's, Schrödinger's, and Kraitchik's switching paradoxes); see the history section.

This kind of interpretation is often called "Bayesian" because it assumes the writer is also incorporating a prior probability distribution of possible amounts of money in the two envelopes in the switching argument.

=== Simple form of Bayesian resolution ===
The simple resolution depended on a particular interpretation of what the writer of the argument is trying to calculate: namely, it assumed he was after the (unconditional) expectation value of what's in Envelope B. In the mathematical literature on Two Envelopes Problem, a different interpretation is more common, involving the conditional expectation value (conditional on what might be in Envelope A). To solve this and related interpretations or versions of the problem, most authors use the Bayesian interpretation of probability, which means that probability reasoning is not only applied to truly random events like the random pick of an envelope, but also to our knowledge (or lack of knowledge) about things which are fixed but unknown, like the two amounts originally placed in the two envelopes, before one is picked at random and called "Envelope A". Moreover, according to a long tradition going back at least to Laplace and his principle of insufficient reason one is supposed to assign equal probabilities when one has no knowledge at all concerning the possible values of some quantity. Thus the fact that we are not told anything about how the envelopes are filled can already be converted into probability statements about these amounts. No information means that probabilities are equal.

In steps 6 and 7 of the switching argument, the writer imagines that envelope A contains a certain amount a, and then seems to believe that given that information, the other envelope would be equally likely to contain twice or half that amount. That assumption can only be correct, if prior to knowing what was in Envelope A, the writer would have considered the following two pairs of values for both envelopes equally likely: the amounts a/2 and a; and the amounts a and 2a. (This follows from Bayes' rule in odds form: posterior odds equal prior odds times likelihood ratio). But now we can apply the same reasoning, imagining not a but a/2 in Envelope A. And similarly, for 2a. And similarly, ad infinitum, repeatedly halving or repeatedly doubling as many times as you like.

Suppose for the sake of argument, we start by imagining an amount of 32 in Envelope A. In order that the reasoning in steps 6 and 7 is correct whatever amount happened to be in Envelope A, we apparently believe in advance that all the following ten amounts are all equally likely to be the smaller of the two amounts in the two envelopes: 1, 2, 4, 8, 16, 32, 64, 128, 256, 512 (equally likely powers of 2). But going to even larger or even smaller amounts, the "equally likely" assumption starts to appear a bit unreasonable. Suppose we stop, just with these ten equally likely possibilities for the smaller amount in the two envelopes. In that case, the reasoning in steps 6 and 7 was entirely correct if envelope A happened to contain any of the amounts 2, 4, ... 512: switching envelopes would give an expected (average) gain of 25%. If envelope A happened to contain the amount 1, then the expected gain is actually 100%. But if it happened to contain the amount 1024, a massive loss of 50% (of a rather large amount) would have been incurred. That only happens once in twenty times, but it is exactly enough to balance the expected gains in the other 19 out of 20 times.

Alternatively, we do go on ad infinitum but now we are working with a quite ludicrous assumption, implying for instance, that it is infinitely more likely for the amount in envelope A to be smaller than 1, and infinitely more likely to be larger than 1024, than between those two values. This is a so-called improper prior distribution: probability calculus breaks down; expectation values are not even defined.

Many authors have also pointed out that if a maximum sum that can be put in the envelope with the smaller amount exists, then it is very easy to see that Step 6 breaks down, since if the player holds more than the maximum sum that can be put into the "smaller" envelope they must hold the envelope containing the larger sum, and are thus certain to lose by switching. This may not occur often, but when it does, the heavy loss the player incurs means that, on average, there is no advantage in switching. Some writers consider that this resolves all practical cases of the problem.

But the problem can also be resolved mathematically without assuming a maximum amount. Nalebuff, Christensen and Utts, Falk and Konold, Blachman, Christensen and Utts, Nickerson and Falk, pointed out that if the amounts of money in the two envelopes have any proper probability distribution representing the player's prior beliefs about the amounts of money in the two envelopes, then it is impossible that whatever the amount A=a in the first envelope might be, it would be equally likely, according to these prior beliefs, that the second contains a/2 or 2a. Thus step 6 of the argument, which leads to always switching, is a non-sequitur, also when there is no maximum to the amounts in the envelopes.

=== Introduction to further developments in connection with Bayesian probability theory ===
The first two resolutions discussed above (the "simple resolution" and the "Bayesian resolution") correspond to two possible interpretations of what is going on in step 6 of the argument. They both assume that step 6 indeed is "the bad step". But the description in step 6 is ambiguous. Is the author after the unconditional (overall) expectation value of what is in envelope B (perhaps - conditional on the smaller amount, x), or is he after the conditional expectation of what is in envelope B, given any possible amount a which might be in envelope A? Thus, there are two main interpretations of the intention of the composer of the paradoxical argument for switching, and two main resolutions.

A large literature has developed concerning variants of the problem. The standard assumption about the way the envelopes are set up is that a sum of money is in one envelope, and twice that sum is in another envelope. One of the two envelopes is randomly given to the player (envelope A). The originally proposed problem does not make clear exactly how the smaller of the two sums is determined, what values it could possibly take and, in particular, whether there is a minimum or a maximum sum it might contain. However, if we are using the Bayesian interpretation of probability, then we start by expressing our prior beliefs as to the smaller amount in the two envelopes through a probability distribution. Lack of knowledge can also be expressed in terms of probability.

A first variant within the Bayesian version is to come up with a proper prior probability distribution of the smaller amount of money in the two envelopes, such that when Step 6 is performed properly, the advice is still to prefer Envelope B, whatever might be in Envelope A. So though the specific calculation performed in step 6 was incorrect (there is no proper prior distribution such that, given what is in the first envelope A, the other envelope is always equally likely to be larger or smaller) a correct calculation, depending on what prior we are using, does lead to the result $E(B | A = a) > a$ for all possible values of a.

In these cases, it can be shown that the expected sum in both envelopes is infinite. There is no gain, on average, in swapping.

=== Second mathematical variant ===
Though Bayesian probability theory can resolve the first mathematical interpretation of the paradox above, it turns out that examples can be found of proper probability distributions, such that the expected value of the amount in the second envelope, conditioned on the amount in the first, does exceed the amount in the first, whatever it might be. The first such example was already given by Nalebuff. See also Christensen and Utts (1992).

Denote again the amount of money in the first envelope by A and that in the second by B. We think of these as random. Let X be the smaller of the two amounts and Y=2X be the larger. Notice that once we have fixed a probability distribution for X then the joint probability distribution of A, B is fixed, since A, B = X, Y or Y, X each with probability 1/2, independently of X, Y.

The bad step 6 in the "always switching" argument led us to the finding E(B|A=a)>a for all a, and hence to the recommendation to switch, whether or not we know a. Now, it turns out that one can quite easily invent proper probability distributions for X, the smaller of the two amounts of money, such that this bad conclusion is still true. One example is analyzed in more detail, in a moment.

As mentioned before, it cannot be true that whatever a, given A=a, B is equally likely to be a/2 or 2a, but it can be true that whatever a, given A=a, B is larger in expected value than a.

Suppose for example that the envelope with the smaller amount actually contains 2^{n} dollars with probability 2^{n}/3^{n+1} where n = 0, 1, 2, ... These probabilities sum to 1, hence the distribution is a proper prior (for subjectivists) and a completely decent probability law also for frequentists.

Imagine what might be in the first envelope. A sensible strategy would certainly be to swap when the first envelope contains 1, as the other must then contain 2. Suppose on the other hand the first envelope contains 2. In that case, there are two possibilities: the envelope pair in front of us is either {1, 2} or {2, 4}. All other pairs are impossible. The conditional probability that we are dealing with the {1, 2} pair, given that the first envelope contains 2, is

$$\begin{align}
P(\{1,2\} \mid 2) &= \frac{P(\{1,2\})/2}{P(\{1,2\})/2+P(\{2,4\})/2} \\
&= \frac{P(\{1,2\})}{P(\{1,2\})+P(\{2,4\})} \\
&= \frac{1/3}{1/3 + 2/9} = 3/5,
\end{align}$$

and consequently the probability it's the {2, 4} pair is 2/5, since these are the only two possibilities. In this derivation, $P(\{1,2\})/2$ is the probability that the envelope pair is the pair 1 and 2, and envelope A happens to contain 2; $P(\{2,4\})/2$ is the probability that the envelope pair is the pair 2 and 4, and (again) envelope A happens to contain 2. Those are the only two ways that envelope A can end up containing the amount 2.

It turns out that these proportions hold in general unless the first envelope contains 1. Denote by a the amount we imagine finding in Envelope A, if we were to open that envelope, and suppose that a = 2^{n} for some n ≥ 1. In that case the other envelope contains a/2 with probability 3/5 and 2a with probability 2/5.

So either the first envelope contains 1, in which case the conditional expected amount in the other envelope is 2, or the first envelope contains a > 1, and though the second envelope is more likely to be smaller than larger, its conditionally expected amount is larger: the conditionally expected amount in Envelope B is

$$\frac{3}{5} \frac{a}{2} + \frac{2}{5} 2a = \frac{11}{10}a$$

which is more than a. This means that the player who looks in envelope A would decide to switch whatever he saw there. Hence there is no need to look in envelope A to make that decision.

This conclusion is just as clearly wrong as it was in the preceding interpretations of the Two Envelopes Problem. But now the flaws noted above do not apply; the a in the expected value calculation is a constant and the conditional probabilities in the formula are obtained from a specified and proper prior distribution.

=== Proposed resolutions through mathematical economics ===
Most writers think that the new paradox can be defused, although the resolution requires concepts from mathematical economics. Suppose $E(B|A=a)>a$ for all $a$. It can be shown that this is possible for some probability distributions of X (the smaller amount of money in the two envelopes) only if $E(X)=\infty$. That is, only if the mean of all possible values of money in the envelopes is infinite. To see why, compare the series described above in which the probability of each X is 2/3 as likely as the previous X with one in which the probability of each X is only 1/3 as likely as the previous X. When the probability of each subsequent term is greater than one-half of the probability of the term before it (and each X is twice that of the X before it) the mean is infinite, but when the probability factor is less than one-half, the mean converges. In the cases where the probability factor is less than one-half, $E(B|A=a)<a$ for all a other than the first, smallest a, and the total expected value of switching converges to 0. In addition, if an ongoing distribution with a probability factor greater than one-half is made finite by, after any number of terms, establishing a final term with "all the remaining probability," that is, 1 minus the probability of all previous terms, the expected value of switching with respect to the probability that A is equal to the last, largest a will exactly negate the sum of the positive expected values that came before, and again the total expected value of switching drops to 0 (this is the general case of setting out an equal probability of a finite set of values in the envelopes described above). Thus, the only distributions that seem to point to a positive expected value for switching are those in which $E(X)=\infty$. Averaging over a, it follows that $E(B)=E(A)=\infty$ (because A and B have identical probability distributions, by symmetry, and both A and B are greater than or equal to X).

If we do not look into the first envelope, then clearly there is no reason to switch, since we would be exchanging one unknown amount of money (A), whose expected value is infinite, for another unknown amount of money (B), with the same probability distribution and infinite expected value. However, if we do look into the first envelope, then for all values observed ($A=a$) we would want to switch because $E(B|A=a)>a$ for all a. As noted by David Chalmers, this problem can be described as a failure of dominance reasoning.

Under dominance reasoning, the fact that we strictly prefer A to B for all possible observed values a should imply that we strictly prefer A to B without observing a; however, as already shown, that is not true because $E(B)=E(A)=\infty$. To salvage dominance reasoning while allowing $E(B)=E(A)=\infty$, one would have to replace expected value as the decision criterion, thereby employing a more sophisticated argument from mathematical economics.

For example, we could assume the decision maker is an expected utility maximizer with initial wealth W whose utility function, $u(w)$, is chosen to satisfy $E(u(W+B)|A=a)<u(W+a)$ for at least some values of a (that is, holding onto $A=a$ is strictly preferred to switching to B for some a). Although this is not true for all utility functions, it would be true if $u(w)$ had an upper bound, $\beta<\infty$, as w increased toward infinity (a common assumption in mathematical economics and decision theory). Michael R. Powers provides necessary and sufficient conditions for the utility function to resolve the paradox, and notes that neither $u(w)<\beta$ nor $E(u(W+A))=E(u(W+B))<\infty$ is required.

Some writers would prefer to argue that in a real-life situation, $u(W+A)$ and $u(W+B)$ are bounded simply because the amount of money in an envelope is bounded by the total amount of money in the world (M), implying $u(W+A) \leq u(W+M)$ and $u(W+B) \leq u(W+M)$. From this perspective, the second paradox is resolved because the postulated probability distribution for X (with $E(X)=\infty$) cannot arise in a real-life situation. Similar arguments are often used to resolve the St. Petersburg paradox.

=== Controversy among philosophers ===
As mentioned above, any distribution producing this variant of the paradox must have an infinite mean. So before the player opens an envelope the expected gain from switching is "∞ − ∞", which is not defined. In the words of David Chalmers, this is "just another example of a familiar phenomenon, the strange behavior of infinity". Chalmers suggests that decision theory generally breaks down when confronted with games having a diverging expectation, and compares it with the situation generated by the classical St. Petersburg paradox.

However, Clark and Shackel argue that this blaming it all on "the strange behavior of infinity" does not resolve the paradox at all; neither in the single case nor the averaged case. They provide a simple example of a pair of random variables both having infinite mean but where it is clearly sensible to prefer one to the other, both conditionally and on average. They argue that decision theory should be extended so as to allow infinite expectation values in some situations.

== Smullyan's non-probabilistic variant ==
The logician Raymond Smullyan questioned if the paradox has anything to do with probabilities at all. He did this by expressing the problem in a way that does not involve probabilities. The following plainly logical arguments lead to conflicting conclusions:

1. Let the amount in the envelope chosen by the player be A. By swapping, the player may gain A or lose A/2. So the potential gain is strictly greater than the potential loss.
2. Let the amounts in the envelopes be X and 2X. Now by swapping, the player may gain X or lose X. So the potential gain is equal to the potential loss.

=== Proposed resolutions ===
A number of solutions have been put forward. Careful analyses have been made by some logicians. Though solutions differ, they all pinpoint semantic issues concerned with counterfactual reasoning. We want to compare the amount that we would gain by switching if we would gain by switching, with the amount we would lose by switching if we would indeed lose by switching. However, we cannot both gain and lose by switching at the same time. We are asked to compare two incompatible situations. Only one of them can factually occur, the other is a counterfactual situation—somehow imaginary. To compare them at all, we must somehow "align" the two situations, providing some definite points in common.

James Chase argues that the second argument is correct because it does correspond to the way to align two situations (one in which we gain, the other in which we lose), which is preferably indicated by the problem description. Also, Bernard Katz and Doris Olin argue this point of view. In the second argument, we consider the amounts of money in the two envelopes as being fixed; what varies is which one is first given to the player. Because that was an arbitrary and physical choice, the counterfactual world in which the player, counterfactually, got the other envelope to the one he was actually (factually) given is a highly meaningful counterfactual world and hence the comparison between gains and losses in the two worlds is meaningful. This comparison is uniquely indicated by the problem description, in which two amounts of money are put in the two envelopes first, and only after that is one chosen arbitrarily and given to the player. In the first argument, however, we consider the amount of money in the envelope first given to the player as fixed and consider the situations where the second envelope contains either half or twice that amount. This would only be a reasonable counterfactual world if in reality the envelopes had been filled as follows: first, some amount of money is placed in the specific envelope that will be given to the player; and secondly, by some arbitrary process, the other envelope is filled (arbitrarily or randomly) either with double or with half of that amount of money.

Byeong-Uk Yi, on the other hand, argues that comparing the amount you would gain if you would gain by switching with the amount you would lose if you would lose by switching is a meaningless exercise from the outset. According to his analysis, all three implications (switch, indifferent, do not switch) are incorrect. He analyses Smullyan's arguments in detail, showing that intermediate steps are being taken, and pinpointing exactly where an incorrect inference is made according to his formalization of counterfactual inference. An important difference with Chase's analysis is that he does not take account of the part of the story where we are told that the envelope called envelope A is decided completely at random. Thus, Chase puts probability back into the problem description in order to conclude that arguments 1 and 3 are incorrect, argument 2 is correct, while Yi keeps "two envelope problem without probability" completely free of probability and comes to the conclusion that there are no reasons to prefer any action. This corresponds to the view of Albers et al., that without a probability ingredient, there is no way to argue that one action is better than another, anyway.

Bliss argues that the source of the paradox is that when one mistakenly believes in the possibility of a larger payoff that does not, in actuality, exist, one is mistaken by a larger margin than when one believes in the possibility of a smaller payoff that does not actually exist. If, for example, the envelopes contained $5.00 and $10.00 respectively, a player who opened the $10.00 envelope would expect the possibility of a $20.00 payout that simply does not exist. Were that player to open the $5.00 envelope instead, he would believe in the possibility of a $2.50 payout, which constitutes a smaller deviation from the true value; this results in the paradoxical discrepancy.

Albers, Kooi, and Schaafsma consider that without adding probability (or other) ingredients to the problem, Smullyan's arguments do not give any reason to swap or not to swap, in any case. Thus, there is no paradox. This dismissive attitude is common among writers from probability and economics: Smullyan's paradox arises precisely because he takes no account whatever of probability or utility.

== Conditional switching ==
As an extension to the problem, consider the case where the player is allowed to look in envelope A before deciding whether to switch. In this "conditional switching" problem, it is often possible to generate a gain over the "never switching" strategy", depending on the probability distribution of the envelopes.

== See also ==
- Bayesian probability
- Bertrand's paradox
- Boy or Girl paradox
- Decision theory
- Monty Hall problem
- Newcomb's paradox
- Siegel's paradox
- Sleeping Beauty problem
- St. Petersburg paradox
