= Sucker bet =

A sucker bet is a gambling wager in which the expected return does not reflect the odds of winning, and is significantly lower. For example, the chances of correctly guessing the order of the final three cards in a game of Faro is usually 1 in 6, yet the bet only pays 4:1 or 5:1. The complexity of the game can disguise the nature of the odds, so that the player does not realise that they are taking a sucker bet. Another variety of sucker bet involves the bettor not knowing a fact that would significantly change the outcome.

The name originates in that sucker bets are often created to lure inexperienced players into betting against large odds, blinded by the offer of "fast money".

Variants include:

- Parlay: One bet ticket written with at least two wagers (all must win for the ticket to cash).
- Teaser: A sucker wager that allows bettors to add and subtract points from posted odds.
- Exotic: Any wager other than a straight bet or parlay (also referred to as a proposition or prop).

Taking insurance in blackjack is also often considered a sucker bet.
