= Lee Kranefuss =

American businessman, investment manager, corporate adviser, and entrepreneur

- Born: Lee Thomas Kranefuss; September 27, 1961 (age 65); Endicott, NY
- Education: BSEE, Cornell University (1984); MBA, Wharton (1991)
- Board member of: Parker Center for Investment Research, ICI Board of Governors (former)

Lee Thomas Kranefuss (born September 27, 1961) is an American businessman, investment manager, corporate adviser, and entrepreneur.

Kranefuss started and ran the iShares series of exchange-traded funds (ETFs) for Barclays Global Investors (BGI), the asset management arm of Britain's Barclays Bank. BGI was acquired by BlackRock in December 2009. Kranefuss saw the opportunity to commercialize and grow the extant but immaterial ETF industry that had developed by the time iShares was launched in 2000, and is credited with driving ETFs from a novelty product to a mainstream investment choice through aggressive education and promotion of the iShares line. By the end of 2009, global ETF assets exceeded a trillion dollars globally, with nearly half the total in the iShares funds.

In 2012, Kranefuss associated with private equity firm Warburg Pincus. Subsequently, in 2014, acquiring over 50% of Source ETFs, a leading European ETF provider. The firm was successfully sold to Invesco in 2017

In 2016, Kranefuss and associates Vinay Nair and Bruce Lavine (former head of iShares Europe and then COO and President of Wisdom Tree) announced the formation of 55 Capital Partners. Kranefuss has since left his daily and strategic oversight roles with that firm.

In mid-2017, Kranefuss announced he was working on a disruptive web-based application to enable better investment planning. The software is aimed at both individual investors as well as professional advisors. His intent is to build a very intuitive and experiential tools for investment planning, leveraging current machine-learning, classification, and other techniques.

== Career ==
In 1997 Kranefuss joined Barclays Global Investors (BGI), the company that invented index funds. BGI was then the world's largest manager of institutional assets. Kranefuss joined as Director of Strategy & Corporate Development. In that role Kranefuss conceived of the plan for the iShares business. Believing that an aggressive education and sales program would be needed to explain the benefits of exchange-traded funds (ETFs) to investors, iShares was launched in 2000 with an intensive marketing effort behind the initial 40 new iShares funds to be launched in the U.S. — more than doubling the number of products then available in the market.

In 2005, after the departure of co-CEO Andrew Skirton, Kranefuss was promoted to the Executive Committee of BGI, and also put in charge of BGI's Institutional Indexing, Cash Management, Securities Lending, and related businesses – collectively over one trillion dollars in assets, more than 75% of BGI's assets under management, and 42% of the company's profits. By the end of 2007 iShares had surpassed $400B in global assets, with Kranefuss overseeing nearly 80% of BGI's assets and over 60% of BGI's profits.

== iShares sale by Barclays ==
In April 2009, it was reported that Barclays had signed a deal to sell iShares to the European private equity firm CVC Capital Partners for $4.4B. Kranefuss announced at the time he would be stepping away from daily management duties to assume the title of Vice Chairman of iShares, focusing on the transition process. However, during a go-shop period in the CVC contract, Barclays reportedly received significant interest to buy all of BGI – including iShares – by numerous parties. Subsequently, New York money manager BlackRock out-bid all others and purchased BGI, closing the deal in late in the year.

Though having grown iShares by extensive distribution over the decade — into a global fund family with over $500B in assets, and the 4th largest fund family in the U.S. — it was reported in early 2010 that Kranefuss (on reportedly good terms with BlackRock senior management) would continue only through an integration period. He left BlackRock at the end of April 2010.

== Current activities ==
Kranefuss is currently focused on corporate advisory and principal investing in the asset management industry. In September 2011, he and former iShares colleague Rory Tobin announced the formation of ETF Opportunity Partners LLP, with an eye to acquiring ETF businesses (initially in Europe). He and Tobin penned an opinion piece in the Financial Times explaining their perspective the same month.

In December 2012, Warburg Pincus, a global private equity firm backed by more than $30B in capital focused on growth investing, announced the appointment of Kranefuss as an Executive-in-Residence to identify and evaluate investment opportunities in the areas of exchange-traded funds (ETFs), index investing and asset management, particularly in Europe, Asia and Latin America. At the time, Kranefuss commented "The time is ripe to create a large-scale, global, and independent ETF provider that will provide the truly attractive and innovative product – and the support behind it – that ETF investors demand."

In 2014, Kranefuss and Warburg Pincus announced they had acquire 51% of the equity of Source, an ETF provider originally started by a consortium of investment banks including Goldman Sachs, Morgan Stanley, JP Morgan, Bank of America, and Nomura. The founding investment banks were reported to have remained as minority shareholder in Source, backing Kranefuss and Warburg Pincus.

In 2017, Warburg Pincus and the founding shareholders announced they were selling Source. In late 2017 Invesco emerged as the buyer of Source.

Kranefuss was also a seed investor in the quantitative money management company Ada Investment Management, a hedge fund managed by Vinay Nair.

In May 2016, Kranefuss and Nair co-founded a new firm to provide management of portfolios entirely of ETFs, 55 Capital Partners. The hired Bruce Lavine – a key early employee of iShares who went on to be President and COO of Wisdom Tree, a publicly listed ETF provider – as CEO of the new firm. According to their web site press reports and interviews, they have ported investment strategies that implement core portfolios, typically used by large institutions, such that they can be implemented entirely with ETFs. Since that time the company has shifted direction to a more institutional approach. While not involved in daily operations, Kranefuss remains an investor in the current firm, 55 Institutional.

In addition, Kranefuss has pursued an interest in corporate sustainability, and has invested in that area. He appeared at the 2010 Fortune Brainstorm Green conference to talk about that.

== Affiliations ==
Kranefuss’ past and present affiliations include:

- Cornell University – Parker Center for Investment Research
- Ada Investments
- Investment Company Institute – Former member, Board of Governors
- Democratic Party

== Personal life ==
Kranefuss was born in Endicott, New York. He currently divides his time between the San Francisco Bay Area in Marin County and Sun Valley, Idaho.
