= IPath =

In finance, the iPath refer to a family of exchange-traded notes (ETN) issued by Barclays. iPath ETNs are senior, unsecured debt securities of Barclays Bank PLC, covering the following asset classes: Commodities, Equity smart beta, MLPs, Sustainable investing, and Volatility.

The iPath combine the investment aspects of bonds and exchange-traded funds (ETF). The first iPath securities were issued in 2006 and are registered under the Securities Act of 1933, because they are issued by banks, not by investment companies.

The iPath trade close to their intra-day trading value and usually have a 30-year maturity. However, they may be redeemed (with a minimum of 50,0000 units) every Thursday- unlike the daily redemption feature of ETFs. They may also be traded on the secondary market.

Although an iPath security may be linked to an underlying market index its value may change even if there is little or no movement in the index, in the event that the credit rating of the issuer changes, e.g. if the issuer receives a rating downgrade.

== See also ==
- SPDR
- PowerShares
- Structured product
- iShares
