= Tuttle Capital Short Innovation ETF =

Inverse exchange-traded fund

- Traded as: Nasdaq: SARK
- Founded: November 9, 2021; 5 years ago
- Owner: Tuttle Capital Management (2021-2022); AXS Investments (2022-current)
- Website: www.tradretfs.com/sark-1x-short-innovation-daily-etf

The Tuttle Capital Short Innovation ETF (SARK) is an American inverse exchange-traded fund (ETF) listed on the Nasdaq. The ETF launched in November 2021 and is designed to provide returns inverse, on a daily basis, of the ARK Innovation ETF (ARKK), an actively managed ETF by Cathie Wood's Ark Invest. It is the first ETF in the United States to provide inverse exposure to another ETF. It uses swap contracts rather than short selling to achieve inverse exposure to ARKK.

== Overview ==
The Short Innovation ETF is unique in seeking inverse performance of ARKK, an actively managed portfolio of stocks, in contrast to other inverse ETFs which bet against a particular stock market index or industry classification. Ben Johnson, director of global ETF research for Morningstar, described such a product as "unprecedented." In January 2022, Mad Money host Jim Cramer highlighted the ETF as seeking to benefit from the weakness in growth-oriented stocks whose performance have struggled in recent months. Matthew Tuttle, CEO of Tuttle Capital Management, argued that the company's ETF was superior to short selling ARKK because it allows investors to avoid short squeezes and margin calls.

== History ==
Tuttle Capital Management filed with the U.S. Securities and Exchange Commission to launch its Short Innovation ETF under the stock ticker SARK in August 2021, following a period during which Ark Invest was unable to produce high returns for investors. Amidst the outbreak of COVID-19, ARKK was one of the top-performing ETFs in 2020, but it greatly underperformed the market in 2021 amidst a shift in investor preference away from technology stocks. When SARK launched in November 2021, ARKK had a short interest of 17.3%, up from 2% in early 2021, indicating negative sentiment for the portfolio.

The ETF had $5 million in assets at inception. It experienced a trading volume of $843,000 on its first day of trading. As of January 2022, the ETF had $234 million in assets, about $200 million of which came from investor inflows. It had returned around 50% since its inception, amidst continued declines in stock performance of high-growth companies associated with rising Treasury yields.

In November 2022, AXS Investments acquired the ETF lineup of Tuttle Capital Management. In May 2024, AXS Investments launched Tradr ETFs, a family of leveraged and inverse ETFs, and rebranded SARK as "Tradr Short Innovation Daily ETF".

== Reception ==
In a November 2021 interview with Bloomberg News, Wood responded to SARK and short sellers of ARKK, saying "This is what makes a market, right? I never worry about anyone shorting the stocks underlying Ark or with this new ETF," adding that if Ark Invest succeeds, investors betting against ARKK would have to cover their short positions, creating demand for Ark funds.
