= United States Commodity Funds =

American company based in Oakland, CA

United States Commodity Funds LLC
- Type: Private, employee-owned
- Industry: Investment management
- Founded: 2005
- Headquarters: Oakland, California, U.S.
- Products: Exchange-traded funds, asset management, commodities
- AUM: $5 billion (2016)
- Number of employees: 14 (2026)
- Website: uscfinvestments.com

United States Commodity Funds LLC (USCF) is a US company based in Oakland, CA, specializing in managing exchange-traded commodity funds, which are often referred to as commodity-based exchange-traded funds (ETFs). USCF was one of the earliest issuers of exchange-traded commodity funds in the United States. It is best known for launching in 2006 the first crude oil based exchange traded commodity fund in the United States, United States Oil Fund, LP (ticker: USO), as well as launching in 2007 the first natural gas exchange traded commodity fund, United States Natural Gas Fund, LP (ticker: UNG). USO and UNG are two of the most actively traded ETFs in the United States. As of June 30, 2016, USCF managed eleven different exchange traded commodity funds with total assets of approximately $5 billion.

== History ==
United States Commodity Funds LLC is an issuer of exchange traded commodity products (ETPs). It was founded in 2005 in Alameda, CA. The first fund it launched, in 2006, was United States Oil Fund, LP. USO was the first commodity ETF based on crude oil launched in the United States. USO was the fourth commodity ETP launched in the United States, after the SPDR Gold Shares Trust (ticker: GLD), the iShares COMEX Gold Trust (ticker: IAU), and the Powershares DB Commodity Index Fund (ticker: DBC). USO is the largest and most actively traded oil-based ETP in the United States.

In 2007, USCF launched United States Natural Gas Fund, LP, the first natural gas based ETP. UNG is the largest and most actively traded natural gas commodity ETP in the United States. USCF also launched the first gasoline based commodity ETP, United States Gasoline Fund, LP (ticker:UGA), and the first heating oil based commodity ETP, the United States Heating Oil Fund, LP, both in 2008. In 2010, USCF launched the first commodity ETP in the United States that invested in Brent crude oil (ticker:BNO), although previously a Brent crude oil based commodity ETP had been launched in London.

In 2010, USCF launched its first non-energy specific commodity ETP, United States Commodity Index Fund (ticker:USCI), which holds a diversified basket of commodity futures based on the SummerHaven Dynamic Commodity Index ("SDCI"). The SDCI is the first broadly diversified commodity index whose commodity weightings are not fixed, but which instead are adjusted to reflect market conditions.

USCF's commodity exchange traded products are all listed on the New York Stock Exchange. Prior to the merger of the American Stock Exchange with the New York Stock Exchange, all of USCF's products were listed for trading on the American Stock Exchange.

On October 6, 2010, commodity index provider SummerHaven Index Management announced that USCF had licensed two new indexes from SummerHaven.

== Funds ==
The ETPs offered by USCF include seven single commodity funds, each based on an energy related commodity, and multiple other commodity funds. The full listing of USCF funds as of April 2026:

Broad Commodity

- USCF SummerHaven Dynamic Commodity Strategy No K-1 Fund (ticker: SDCI)
- United States Commodity Index Fund (ticker: USCI)

Sustainable Commodities

- USCF Sustainable Battery Metals Strategy Fund (ticker: ZSB)
- USCF Sustainable Commodity Strategy Fund (ticker: ZSC)

Other Commodity Strategies

- USCF Energy Commodity Strategy Absolute Return Fund (ticker: USE)
- USCF Gold Strategy Plus Income Fund (ticker: USG)
- USCF Oil Plus Bitcoin Strategy Fund (ticker: WTIB)

Single Commodity

- United States Brent Oil Fund, LP (ticker: BNO)
- United States Copper Index Fund (ticker: CPER)
- United States Gasoline Fund, LP (ticker: UGA)
- United States Natural Gas Fund, LP (ticker: UNG)
- United States 12 Month Natural Gas Fund, LP (ticker: UNL)
- United States 12 Month Oil Fund, LP (ticker: USL)
- United States Oil Fund, LP (ticker: USO)

Equity

- USCF Dividend Income Fund (ticker: UDI)
- USCF Midstream Energy Income Fund (ticker: UMI)
