= Kranefuss =

Kranefuss (or Kranefuß) is a German surname, and may refer to:

- Fritz Kranefuss (1900–1945), German industrialist
- Lee Kranefuss (born 1961), American businessman
- Michael Kranefuss (born 1938), German-American former head of Ford Motor Company's International motorsports division
