= USCF =

USCF may refer to:

- United States Chess Federation, the governing body for chess competition in the United States.
- United States Commodity Funds
- USA Cycling - United States Cycling Federation
- Utah State Correctional Facility, a prison
