= Direxion =

American financial institution

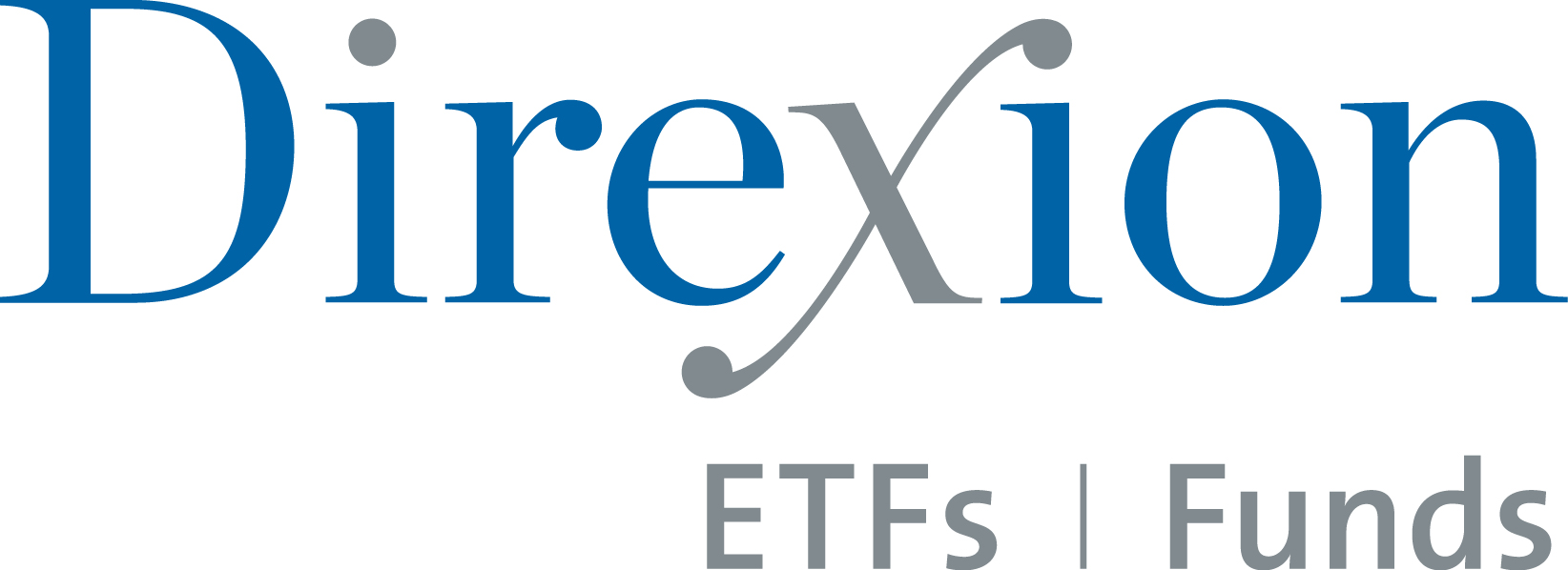
- Formerly: Potomac Funds
- Type: Private
- Industry: Finance
- Founded: 1997; 29 years ago in Alexandria, Virginia, United States
- Products: Leveraged, inverse, and thematic exchange-traded funds
- Website: direxion.com

Direxion is an American provider of financial products known for its leveraged ETFs. Founded in Alexandria, Virginia, the company also has offices in New York City, Boston, and Hong Kong.

== History ==
Direxion was founded in 1997 under the name Potomac Funds as a provider of mutual funds. The original name referred to the Potomac River near the company's first office in Alexandria, Virginia. In November 1997, Potomac Funds became the second company to introduce an inverse mutual fund, following a similar move by Rydex Investments in 1994. The company began using the Direxion name in 2006. The use of the letter "X" in the new name was intended to draw attention to the leveraged index funds in the company's offerings. That year the company also opened an office in the Prudential Tower in Boston, Massachusetts.

Direxion launched its first leveraged ETFs in 2008. In November 2008 the company was the first to offer ETFs with 3X leverage, a move that was copied some months later by its competitors ProShares and Rydex Investments. The move made it one of the fastest-growing ETF companies, with its sixteen 3X ETFs reaching a total of $3.4 billion in assets by April 2009. The move towards higher-leverage offerings by the three companies provoked scrutiny from the U.S. Securities and Exchange Commission and the Massachusetts Secretary of the Commonwealth, and a number of broker-dealers stopped selling leveraged ETFs. The criticisms centered around perceived tracking error: the ETFs were designed to achieve the stated multiple of the return on the underlying on a daily basis only (with the cost of the daily rebalancing passed on to investors in the form of higher expense ratios), but commentators suggested that some investors, even institutional investors, had mistakenly tried to use the inverse products as longer-term hedges against their underlyings.

In December 2010, Direxion added 24 ETFs to its range of offerings, including some non-leveraged funds, and continued to expand its offering of non-leveraged funds in 2011. The company's gold miner bull and bear ETFs are among the most-traded gold-related leveraged ETFs. In February 2020, the company announced the launch of its first leveraged environmental, social and corporate governance fund, offering 150% long exposure and 50% short exposure respectively to the best- and worst-scoring companies in the MSCI USA ESG index, with a quarterly rebalance. In March 2020, amidst the 2020 stock market crash, Direxion announced that it would reduce the leverage of ten of its ETFs from 3x to 2x and close eight others. This was part of a broader trend among providers of leveraged ETFs during the first quarter of 2020; nevertheless, Direxion saw inflows of nearly $4 billion during March 2020 alone.

== List of funds ==
=== Leveraged and inverse ETFs ===
Direxion Daily	Bear 1X Shares		Bull 2X Shares		Bear 2X Shares		Bull 3X Shares		Bear 3X Shares		References
Direxion Daily	Ticker	Comments	Ticker	Comments	Ticker	Comments	Ticker	Comments	Ticker	Comments	References
S&P 500	SPDN		SPUU				SPXL		SPXS		
Mid Cap			MDLL	Liquidated Oct. 2015	MDSS	Registered, never offered	MIDU		MIDZ	Liquidated Apr. 2020	
Small Cap		Registered, never offered	SMLL		SMSS	Registered, never offered	TNA		TNZ		
Regional Banks							DPST		WDRW	Liquidated Apr. 2020	
Gold							BAR		BARS	Liquidated Dec. 2014	
Gold Miners Index	MELT	Liquidated Sep. 2017	NUGT	3X until May 2020	DUST	3X until May 2020	NUGT	Became 2X in May 2020	DUST	Became 2X in May 2020	
Junior Gold Miners Index			JNUG	3X until May 2020	JDST	3X until May 2020	JNUG	Became 2X in May 2020	JDST	Became 2X in May 2020	
Silver Miners Index			SHNY	Liquidated Sep. 2018	DULL	Liquidated Sep. 2017					
Energy	ERYY	Liquidated Sep. 2017	ERX	3X until May 2020	ERY	3X until May 2020	ERX	Became 2X in May 2020	ERY	Became 2X in May 2020	
S&P Oil & Gas Exp. & Prod			GUSH	3X until May 2020	DRIP	3X until May 2020	GUSH	Became 2X in May 2020	DRIP	Became 2X in May 2020	
Natural Gas Related							GASL	Liquidated Apr. 2020	GASX	Liquidated Apr. 2020	
Agribusiness							COWL	Liquidated Sep. 2012	COWS	Liquidated Sep. 2012	
Basic Materials							MATL	Liquidated Oct. 2015	MATS	Liquidated Sep. 2012	
S&P Biotech	LABS	Liquidated Sep. 2017					LABU		LABD		
Consumer Staples	SPLZ	Liquidated Sep. 2017					NEED		LACK		
Cyber Security & IT			HAKK	Liquidated Sept. 2017	HAKD	Liquidated Apr. 2017					
Financials	FAZZ	Liquidated Sep. 2017					FAS		FAZ		
Healthcare							CURE		SICK	Liquidated Sep. 2017	
Homebuilders & Supplies							NAIL		CLAW	Liquidated Sep. 2017	
Pharmaceutical & Medical			PILL	Liquidated Apr. 2017	PILS	Liquidated Apr. 2017	PILL	Recycled ticker		Registered, never offered	
Retail							RETL		RETS	Liquidated Sep. 2012	
Semiconductors							SOXL		SOXS		
Technology	TECZ	Liquidated Sep. 2017					TECL		TECS		
Utilities	UTLZ	Liquidated Sep. 2017					UTLL		UTLS	Registered, never offered	
BRIC							BRIL	Liquidated Sep. 2012	BRIS	Liquidated Sep. 2012	
MSCI Developed Markets							DZK		DPK	Liquidated Apr. 2020	
FTSE Europe							EURL		EURZ	Liquidated Sep. 2014	
MSCI European Financials	EUFS	Liquidated Sep. 2017	EUFL	Liquidated Apr. 2020							
MSCI Brazil			BRZU	3X until May 2020			BRZU	Became 2X in May 2020	BRZS	Liquidated Sep. 2014	
CSI 300 China A Share	CHAD		CHAU								
MSCI India							INDL		INDZ	Liquidated Sep. 2012	
MSCI Japan							JPNL		JPNS	Liquidated Sep. 2014	
Latin America							LBJ		LHB	Liquidated Sep. 2012	
MSCI Mexico							MEXX			Registered, never offered	
Russia			RUSL	3X until May 2020			RUSL	Became 2X in May 2020	RUSS	Liquidated Apr. 2020	
South Korea							KORU		KORZ	Liquidated Sep. 2014	
7-10 Year Treasury			SYTL	Liquidated Oct. 2015	SYTS	Registered, never offered	TYD		TYO		
Total Bond Market	SAGG	Liquidated Apr. 2020						Registered, never offered		Registered, never offered	

=== Thematic and other funds ===
Ticker	Name	Comments	References
ESNG	Direxion MSCI USA ESG - Leaders vs. Laggards ETF	Registered in February 2020	
WFH	Direxion Work From Home ETF	Registered in April 2020	
