= Oil reserves in the United States =

Oil reserves located in the United States

Graph of US proven oil reserves from 1900 to 2012

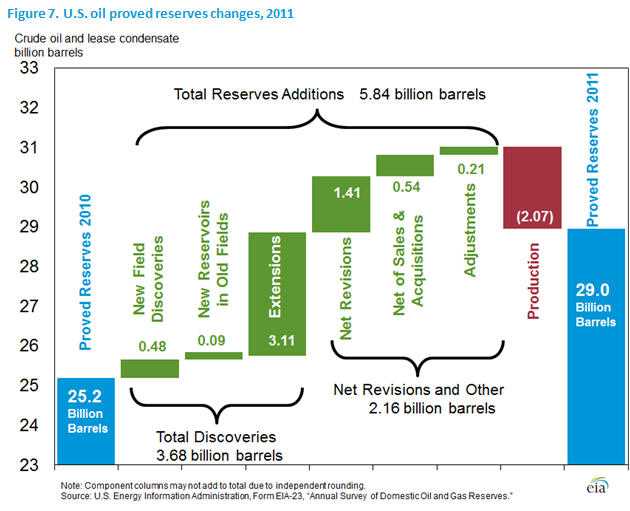
U.S. proved oil changes between 2010 and 2011. Although the US proved oil reserves grew by 3.8 billion barrels in 2011, even after deducting 2.07 billion barrels of production, only 8% of the 5.84 billion barrels of the newly booked oil was due to new field discoveries (US EIA)

At the end of 2024, U.S. proved crude oil and lease condensate reserves totaled 46.0 billion barrels, down from 46.4 billion barrels at the end of 2023.

In 2012, the Energy Information Administration using data compiled by the United States Geological Survey under the Department of the Interior estimated US undiscovered, technically recoverable oil resources to be an additional 198 billion barrels.

== History ==
Over 1 million exploratory and developmental crude oil wells have been drilled in the US since 1949 to estimate the undiscovered, technically recoverable oil in the United States.

The last comprehensive National Assessment was completed in 1995. Since 2000 the USGS has been re-assessing basins of the U.S. that are considered to be priorities for oil and gas resources; re-assessing 22, and has plans to re-assess 10 more basins. These 32 basins represent about 97% of the discovered and undiscovered oil and gas resources of the United States. The three areas considered to hold the most oil are the coastal plain (1002) area of ANWR, the National Petroleum Reserve of Alaska, and the Bakken Formation.

== Major discoveries ==
United States oil production from the early 1900s through 2020 contrasted with the imports of oil

In 1970, the supergiant Prudhoe Bay Oil Field was discovered in Alaska.

== Reserves to production ratio ==
Monthly production trends in the top five oil-producing states in the US

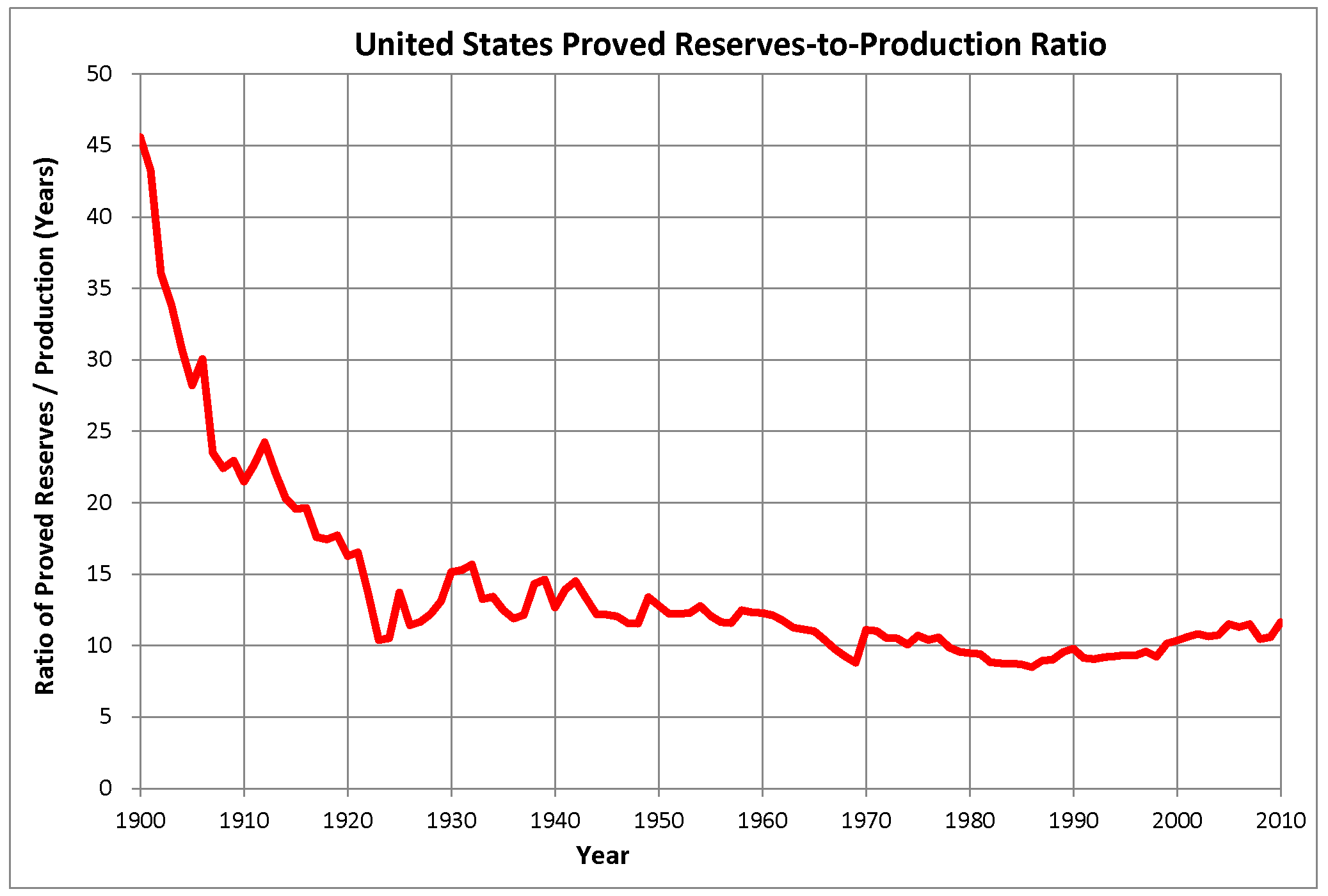
Ratio of United States proved oil reserves to annual production

The reserves-to-production ratio (R/P) was 11.08 years in 1970. It hit a trough of 8.49 years in 1986 as oil pumped through the Alaska pipeline began to peak. R/P was 11.26 years in 2007.

=== Production impacts ===
In 1970, local peak production was 10,044 million bbl (1,597 million m^{3}) per day in November 1970. Total production of crude oil from 1970 through 2006 was 102 billion barrels (16.2×10^{9} m^{3}), or roughly five and a half times the proved reserves over the same timeframe when taking into account the decreasing proved reserves.

When global oil prices (approximately US$147.50) peaked in summer 2008 many petroleum oil extraction projects were brought online, allowing annual production to steadily increase, with one year of decline in 2020 attributed to the COVID-19 pandemic.

In 2012 the oil production of the US increased by 800,000 barrels per day, the highest ever recorded increase in one year since oil drilling began in 1859. In April 2013, US crude production was at a more than 20-year high, aided by the shale gas and tight oil boom; with production near 7.2 million barrels per day. In 2018, the US became the world's top crude oil producer, and has maintained that position ever since. In November 2019, peak production was 13,000 million bbl (2,067 million m^{3}) per day.

== Consumption and net imports ==
Consuming less or importing more oil prolongs the useful life of existing oil reserves.

Between 1970 and 2007, due to declining production and increasing demand, net US imports of oil and petroleum products increased from 3.16 million barrels per day (502×10^{3} m^{3}/d) in 1970 to 12.04 million barrels per day (1.914×10^{6} m^{3}/d) in 2007, before declining as domestic production ramped up.

In 2007, the largest net suppliers of petroleum products to the US were Canada and Mexico, which supplied 2.2 and 1.3 Mbbl/d (350×10^{3} and 210×10^{3} m^{3}/d).

In 2011, the US consumed 18.8 million barrels of petroleum products per day, and imported a net 8.4 million barrels per day; the EIA reported the United States "Dependence on Net Petroleum Imports" in 2011 as 45% accounting for nearly 50% of the US trade deficit in 2011.

For a brief period during 2008–2009 the US became a net exporter of refined oil products.

== Strategic Petroleum Reserve ==
The United States maintains a Strategic Petroleum Reserve at four sites on the Gulf of Mexico, with a total capacity of 727 million barrels (115.6×10^{6} m^{3}) of crude oil. The maximum total withdrawal capability from the United States Strategic Petroleum Reserve is 4.4 million barrels (700,000 m^{3}) per day. This is roughly 32% of US oil imports, or 75% of imports from OPEC.

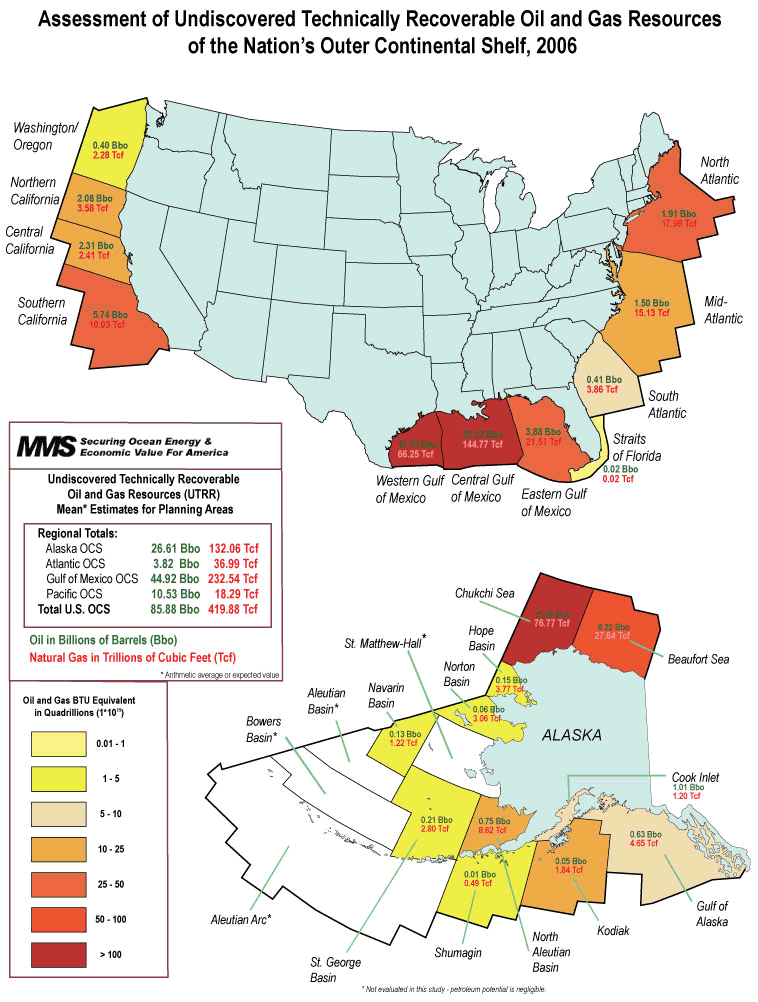
Estimates of Oil Resources in the Outer Continental Shelf in 2006

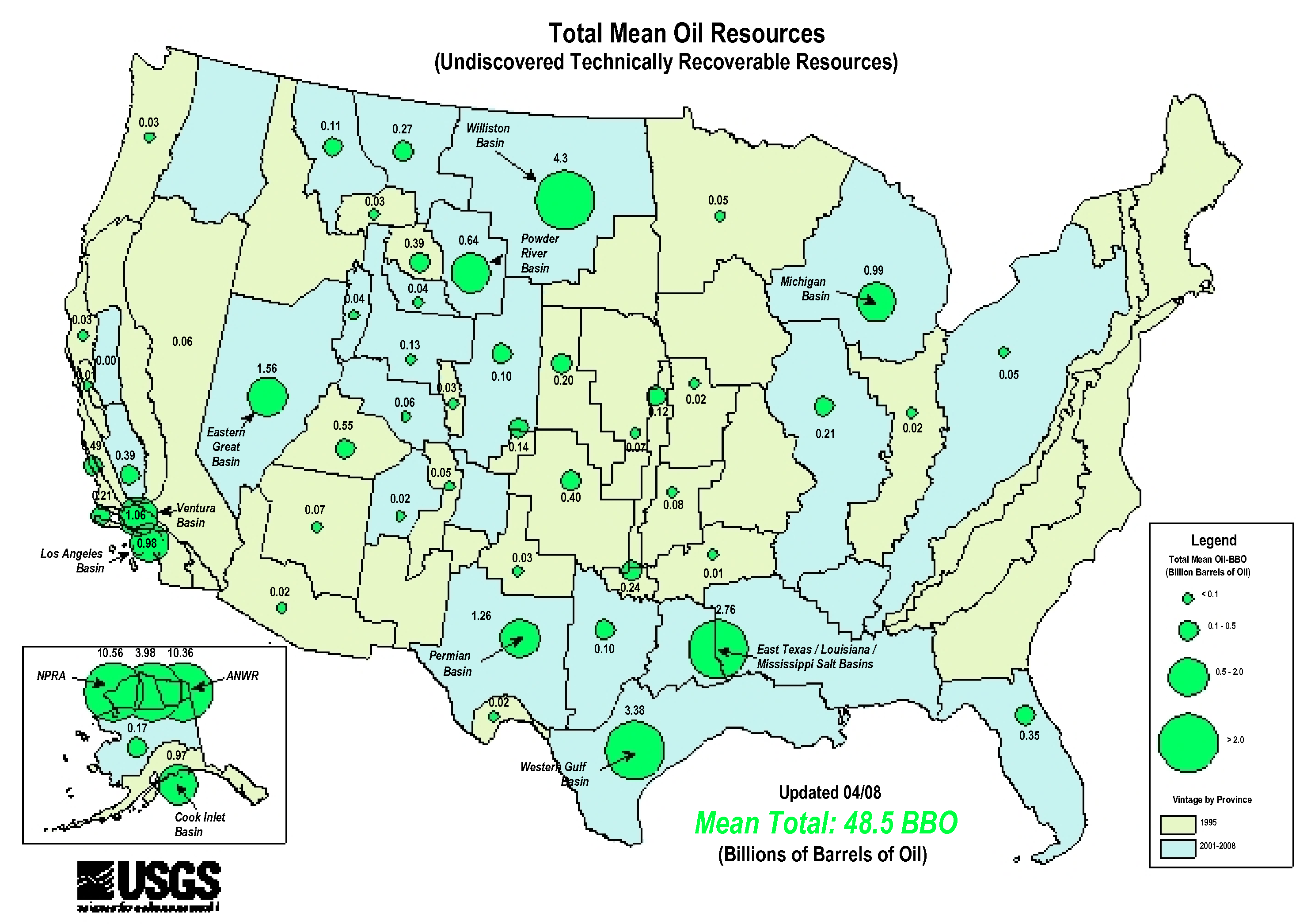
Estimates of Onshore Oil Resources

== Conventional prospective resources ==
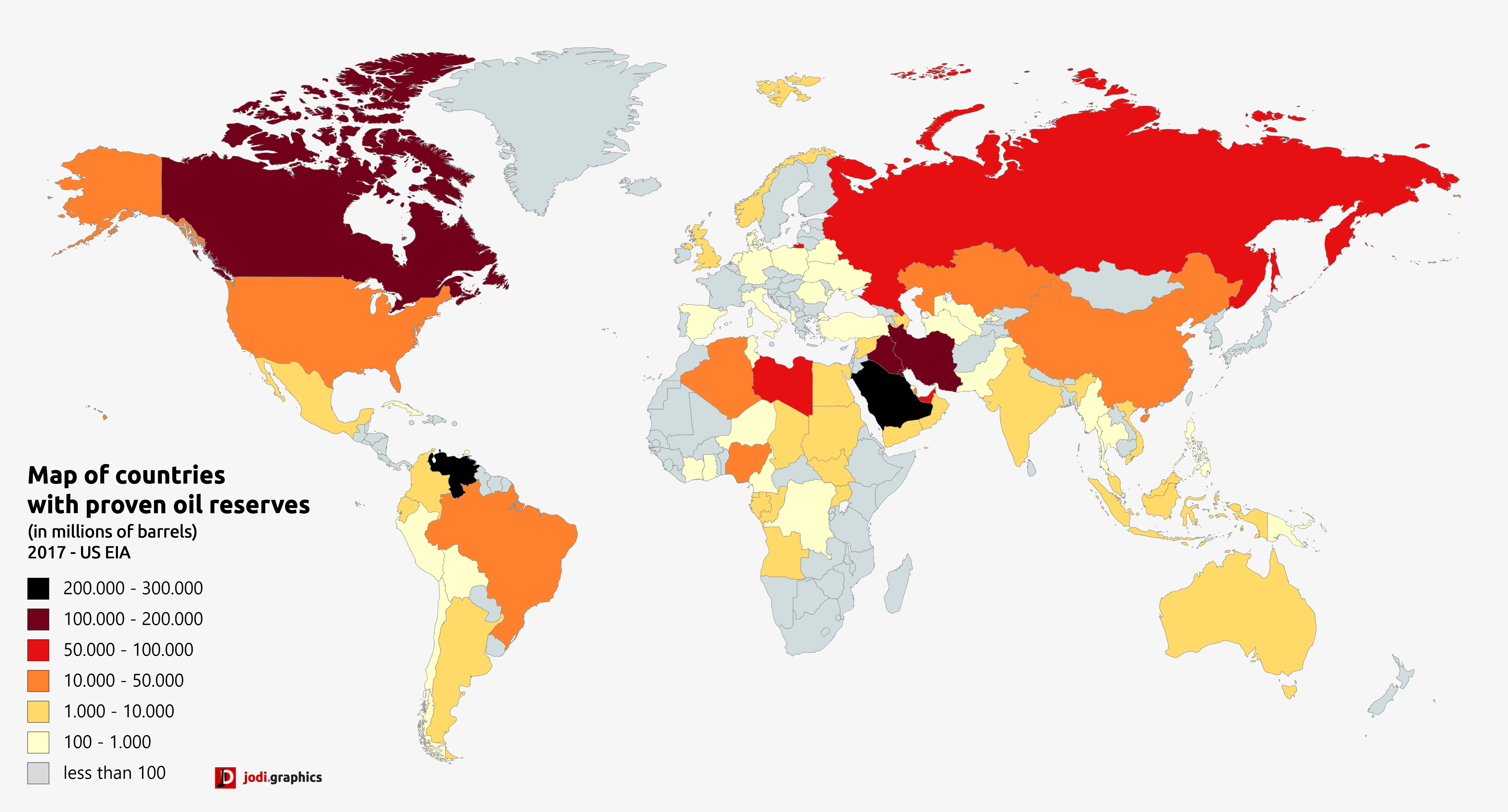
A map of world oil reserves according to U.S. EIA, 2017

=== Onshore ===
The United States Geological Survey (USGS) under the Department of the Interior estimates undiscovered technically recoverable crude oil onshore in United States to be 48.5 billion barrels (7.71×10^{9} m^{3})

==== Arctic ====
In 1998, the USGS estimated that the 1002 area of the Arctic National Wildlife Refuge contains a total of between 5.7 and 16.0 billion barrels (2.54×10^{9} m^{3}) of undiscovered, technically recoverable oil, with a mean estimate of 10.4 billion barrels (1.65×10^{9} m^{3}), of which 7.7 billion barrels (1.22×10^{9} m^{3}) falls within the Federal portion of the ANWR 1002 Area. In May 2008 the EIA used this assessment to estimate the potential cumulative production of the 1002 area of ANWR to be a maximum of 4.3 billion barrels (680,000,000 m^{3}) from 2018 to 2030. This estimate is a best case scenario of technically recoverable oil during the area's primary production years if legislation were passed in 2008 to allow drilling.

A 2002 assessment concluded that the National Petroleum Reserve–Alaska contains between 6.7 and 15.0 billion barrels (2.38×10^{9} m^{3}) of oil, with a mean (expected) value of 10.6 billion barrels (1.69×10^{9} m^{3}). The quantity of undiscovered oil beneath Federal lands (excluding State and Native areas) is estimated to range between 5.9 and 13.2 BBO, with a mean value of 9.3 BBO. Most oil accumulations are expected to be of moderate size, on the order of 30 to 250 million barrels (40,000,000 m^{3}) each. Large accumulations like the Prudhoe Bay oil field (whose ultimate recovery is approximately 13 billion barrels (2.1×10^{9} m^{3})), are not expected to occur. The volumes of undiscovered, technically recoverable oil estimated for NPRA are similar to the volumes estimated for ANWR. However, because of differences in accumulation sizes (the ANWR study area is estimated to contain more accumulations in larger size classes) and differences in assessment area (the NPRA study area is more than 12 times larger than the ANWR study area), economically recoverable resources are different at low oil prices. But at market prices above $40 per barrel, estimates of economically recoverable oil for NPRA are similar to ANWR.

==== Tight oil ====
In April 2008, the USGS released a report giving a new resource assessment of the Bakken Formation underlying portions of Montana and North Dakota. The USGS believes that with new horizontal drilling technology there is somewhere between 3.0 and 4.5 billion barrels (480×10^{6} and 720×10^{6} m^{3}) of undiscovered, technically recoverable oil in this 200,000 square miles (520,000 km^{2}) formation that was initially discovered in 1951. If accurate, this reassessment would make it the largest "continuous" oil accumulation (The USGS uses "continuous" to describe accumulations requiring extensive artificial fracturing to allow the oil to flow to the borehole) ever discovered in the U.S. The formation is estimated to contain significantly more—figures in excess of 150 billion barrels (2.4×10^{10} m^{3}) have been reported—but it is yet uncertain how much of this oil is recoverable using current technology. In 2011, Harold Hamm claimed that the recoverable share may reach 24 billion barrels (3.8×10^{9} m^{3}); this would mean that Bakken contains more extractable petroleum than all other known oil fields in the country, combined.

=== Offshore ===
The Minerals Management Service (MMS) estimates the Federal Outer Continental Shelf (OCS) contains between 66.6 and 115.1 billion barrels (10.59×10^{9} and 18.30×10^{9} m^{3}) of undiscovered technically recoverable crude oil, with a mean estimate of 85.9 billion barrels (13.66×10^{9} m^{3}). The Gulf of Mexico OCS ranks first with a mean estimate of 44.9 billion barrels (7.14×10^{9} m^{3}), followed by Alaska OCS with 38.8 billion barrels (6.17×10^{9} m^{3}). At $80/bbl crude prices, the MMS estimates that 70 billion barrels (11×10^{9} m^{3}) are economically recoverable. As of 2008, a total of about 574 million acres (2,320,000 km^{2}) of the OCS are off-limits to leasing and development. The moratoria and presidential withdrawal cover about 85 percent of OCS area offshore the lower 48 states. The MMS estimates that the resources in OCS areas currently off limits to leasing and development total 17.8 billion barrels (2.83×10^{9} m^{3})(mean estimate).

== Oil shale prospective resources ==
=== Oil shale ===
The United States has the largest known deposits of oil shale in the world, according to the Bureau of Land Management and holds an estimated 2.175 trillion barrels (345.8 km^{3}) of potentially recoverable oil. Oil shale does not actually contain oil, but a waxy oil precursor known as kerogen. There is significant commercial production of oil from oil shale in the United States in North Dakota and Montana.

Oil-bearing shales in North Dakota and Montana are producing increasing amounts of oil. As of April 2013, US crude production was at a more than 20-year high, since the shale gas and tight oil boom; production was near 7.2 million barrels per day.

=== Oil sands ===
There are significant volumes of heavy oil in the oil sands of northeast Utah. There has yet to be any significant production from these deposits.

== See also ==
- Oil reserves
- Strategic Petroleum Reserve (United States)
- United States Oil Fund (USO)
- West Texas Intermediate, a grade of crude oil
