= EWJ =

EWJ may refer to:

- East and West Junction Railway, an early British railway company
- Earthworm Jim (video game)
- iShares MSCI Japan, an exchange-traded fund
