= Rodger Lawson =

American businessman

Rodger Lawson is an English-American businessman. He previously held high level positions at Prudential Financial, Van Eck Global and Fidelity Investments.

== Education and career ==
Lawson returned to Fidelity in August 2007 on the eve of one of worst Financial meltdowns. Chairman Edward "Ned" C. Johnson 3rd has been credited for bringing Lawson back to steer Fidelity through financial crisis. Lawson's management style and several of his key hires have increased Fidelity's profile as one of the most trusted and sound financial firms.

Lawson retired from Fidelity Investments in early 2010. He was appointed to the UnitedHealth Group Board of Directors on February 10, 2011, and the E*Trade Board of Directors on February 10, 2012.
