= List of Australian exchange-traded funds =

This is a table of notable Australian exchange-traded funds, or ETFs, listed on the Australian Securities Exchange.

ASX Code	Issuer	Name	Benchmark	Domicile	MER%
BGBL	Betashares	Betashares Global Shares ETF	Solactive GBS Developed Markets ex Australia Large & Mid Cap Index	AUS	0.08
CRYP	Betashares	Betashares Crypto Innovators ETF	Bitwise Crypto Innovators Index	AUS	0.67
NDQ	Betashares	Betashares NASDAQ 100	NASDAQ 100	AUS	0.48
HNDQ	Betashares	Betashares NASDAQ 100 - Currency Hedged	NASDAQ 100 AUD Hedged	AUS	0.51
A200	Betashares	Betashares Australia 200 ETF	Solactive Australia 200 Index	AUS	0.04
ATEC	Betashares	Betashares S&P/ASX Australian Technology ETF	S&P/ASX All Technology Index	AUS	0.48
CLDD	Betashares	Betashares Cloud Computing ETF	Indxx Global Cloud Computing Index	AUS	0.67
HACK	Betashares	Betashares Global Cybersecurity ETF	Nasdaq Consumer Technology Association Cybersecurity Index	AUS	0.67
RBTZ	Betashares	Betashares Global Robotics and Artificial Intelligence ETF	Indxx Global Robotics & Artificial Intelligence Thematic Index	AUS	0.57
GAME	Betashares	Betashares Video Games and Esports ETF	Nasdaq CTA Global Video Games & Esports Index	AUS	0.57
DRIV	Betashares	Betashares Electric Vehicles and Future Mobility ETF	Solactive Future Mobility Index	AUS	0.67
IPAY	Betashares	Betashares Future of Payments ETF	Nasdaq CTA Global Digital Payments Index	AUS	0.67
IBUY	Betashares	Betashares Online Retail and E-commerce ETF	Solactive EQM Online Retail and E-Commerce Index	AUS	0.67
OZBD	Betashares	Betashares Australian Composite Bond ETF	Australian Enhanced Yield Composite Bond Index	AUS	0.19
ASIA	Betashares	Betashares Asia Technology Tigers ETF	Solactive Asia Ex-Japan Technology & Internet Tigers Index	AUS	0.67
ERTH	Betashares	Betashares Climate Change Innovation ETF	Solactive Climate Change and Environmental Opportunities Index	AUS	0.65
ETHI	Betashares	Betashares Global Sustainability Leaders ETF	Nasdaq Future Global Sustainability Leaders Index	AUS	0.59
HETH	Betashares	Betashares Global Sustainability Leaders ETF - Currency Hedged	Nasdaq Future Global Sustainability Leaders Index AUD Hedged	AUS	0.62
FAIR	Betashares	Betashares Australian Sustainability Leaders ETF	Nasdaq Future Global Sustainability Leaders Index	AUS	0.49
INCM	Betashares	Betashares Global Income Leaders ETF	Nasdaq Global Income Leaders NTR Index	AUS	0.45
QLTY	Betashares	Betashares Global Quality Leaders ETF	iSTOXX MUTB Global Ex-Australia Quality Leaders Index	AUS	0.35
HQLT	Betashares	Betashares Global Quality Leaders ETF - Currency Hedged	iSTOXX MUTB Global Ex-Australia Quality Leaders Index AUD Hedged	AUS	0.38
GBND	Betashares	Betashares Sustainability Leaders Diversified Bond ETF - Currency Hedged	Solactive Australian and Global Select Sustainability Leaders Bond TR Index - AUD Hedged	AUS	0.49
CRED	Betashares	Betashares Australian Investment Grade Corporate Bond ETF	Solactive Australian Investment Grade Corporate Bond Select TR Index	AUS	0.25
AGVT	Betashares	Betashares Australian Government Bond ETF	Solactive Australian Government 7 - 12 Year AUD TR Index	AUS	0.22
GGOV	Betashares	Betashares Global Government Bond 20+ Year ETF - Currency Hedged	S&P G7 Sovereign Duration-Capped 20+ Year AUD Hedged Bond Index	AUS	0.22
HBRD	Betashares	Betashares Active Australian Hybrids Fund (managed fund)	Solactive Australian Hybrid Securities Index	AUS	0.55
BHYB	Betashares	Betashares Australian Major Bank Hybrids Index ETF	Solactive Australian Banking Preferred Shares Index	AUS	0.35
DHHF	Betashares	Betashares All Growth ETF	N/A	AUS	0.19
DZZF	Betashares	Betashares Ethical Diversified High Growth ETF	N/A	AUS	0.39
DGGF	Betashares	Betashares Ethical Diversified Growth ETF	N/A	AUS	0.39
DBBF	Betashares	Betashares Ethical Diversified Balanced ETF	N/A	AUS	0.39
IIND	Betashares	Betashares India Quality ETF	Solactive India Quality Select Index	AUS	0.80
EMMG	Betashares	Betashares Legg Mason Emerging Markets Fund	N/A	AUS	1.0
EINC	Betashares	Betashares Legg Mason Equity Income Fund	N/A	AUS	0.85
RINC	Betashares	Betashares Legg Mason Real Income Fund	N/A	AUS	0.85
BNDS	Betashares	Betashares Legg Mason Australian Bond Fund	N/A	AUS	0.42
AAA	Betashares	Betashares Australian High Interest Cash ETF	Australian Cash	AUS	0.18
F100	Betashares	Betashares FTSE 100 ETF	FTSE 100 Index	AUS	0.45
POU	Betashares	Betashares British Pound ETF	British Pound	AUS	0.45
OOO	Betashares	Betashares Crude Oil Index ETF- Currency Hedged (Synthetic)	S&P/GSCI Crude Oil Index	AUS	0.69
EEU	Betashares	Betashares Euro ETF	Euro	AUS	0.45
QOZ	Betashares	Betashares FTSE RAFI Australia 200 ETF	FTSE RAFI Australia 200	AUS	0.3
QUS	Betashares	Betashares S&P 500 Equal Weight ETF	S&P 500 Equal Weight Index	AUS	0.29
QAU	Betashares	Betashares Gold Bullion ETF - Currency Hedged	Gold	AUS	0.49
QFN	Betashares	Betashares S&P/ASX 200 Financials Sector ETF	S&P/ASX 200 Financials	AUS	0.39
QRE	Betashares	Betashares S&P/ASX 200 Resources Sector ETF	S&P/ASX 200 Resources	AUS	0.39
USD	Betashares	Betashares U.S. Dollar ETF	US Dollar	AUS	0.45
EX20	Betashares	Betashares Australian EX-20 Portfolio Diversifier ETF	Nasdaq Australia Completion Cap Index	AUS	0.25
FOOD	Betashares	Betashares Global Agriculture ETF - Currency Hedged	Nasdaq Global ex-Australia Agriculture Companies Hedged AUD Index	AUS	0.57
BNKS	Betashares	Betashares Global Banks ETF - Currency Hedged	Nasdaq Global ex-Australia Banks Hedged AUD Index	AUS	0.57
FUEL	Betashares	Betashares Global Energy Companies ETF - Currency Hedged	Nasdaq Global ex-Australia Energy Hedged AUD Index	AUS	0.57
MNRS	Betashares	Betashares Global Gold Miners ETF - Currency Hedged	Nasdaq Global ex-Australia Gold Miners Hedged AUD Index	AUS	0.57
DRUG	Betashares	Betashares Global Healthcare ETF - Currency Hedged	Nasdaq Global ex-Australia Healthcare Hedged AUD Index	AUS	0.57
YANK	Betashares	Betashares Strong U.S. Dollar Fund (hedge fund)	US Dollar	AUS	1.38
QPON	Betashares	Betashares Australian Bank Senior Floating Rate Bond ETF	Solactive Australian Bank Senior Floating Rate Bond Index	AUS	0.22
AUDS	Betashares	Betashares Strong Australian Dollar Fund (hedge fund)	Australian Dollar	AUS	1.38
AUST	Betashares	Managed Risk Australian Share Fund (managed fund)	N/A	AUS	0.49
BEAR	Betashares	Australian Equities Bear Hedge Fund	N/A	AUS	1.38
BBOZ	Betashares	Australian Equities Strong Bear Hedge Fund	N/A	AUS	1.38
BBUS	Betashares	U.S. Equities Strong Bear Hedge Fund - Currency Hedged	N/A	AUS	1.38
GEAR	Betashares	Geared Australian Equity Fund (hedge fund)	S&P/ASX 200	AUS	0.8
GGUS	Betashares	Geared U.S. Equity Fund - Currency Hedged (hedge fund)	S&P 500 Hedged AUD	AUS	0.74
HEUR	Betashares	Betashares Europe ETF - Currency Hedged	S&P Eurozone Exporters Hedged AUD Index	AUS	0.56
HJPN	Betashares	Betashares Japan ETF - Currency Hedged	S&P Japan Exporters Hedged AUD Index	AUS	0.56
HVST	Betashares	Australian Dividend Harvester Fund (managed fund)	N/A	AUS	0.9
SMLL	Betashares	Australian Small Companies Select Fund (managed fund)	S&P/ASX Small Ordinaries Accumulation Index	AUS	0.39
UMAX	Betashares	S&P 500 Yield Maximiser Fund (managed fund)	S&P 500	AUS	0.79
WRLD	Betashares	Managed Risk Global Share Fund (managed fund)	N/A	AUS	0.54
YMAX	Betashares	Equity Yield Maximiser Fund (managed fund)	S&P/ASX 20	AUS	0.79
PMGOLD	Perth Mint	Perth Mint Gold ETF AUD	Gold	AUS	0.15
ESTX	ETF Securities	ETFS Euro Stoxx 50 ETF	Euro Stoxx 50	AUS	0.35
ROBO	ETF Securities	ETFS ROBO Global Robotics and Automation ETF	ROBO Global® Robotics and Automation Index	AUS	0.69
VDCO	Vanguard	Vanguard Diversified Conservative Index ETF	N/A	AUS	0.27
VDBA	Vanguard	Vanguard Diversified Balanced Index ETF	N/A	AUS	0.27
VDGR	Vanguard	Vanguard Diversified Growth Index ETF	N/A	AUS	0.27
VDHG	Vanguard	Vanguard Diversified High Growth Index ETF	N/A	AUS	0.27
ZGOL	ANZ/ETF Securities	ANZ ETFS Physical Gold ETF	Gold	AUS	0.4
TECH	ANZ/ETF Securities	ETFS Morningstar Global Technology ETF	Morningstar Developed Markets Technology Moat Focus Index	AUS	0.45
ZCNH	ANZ/ETF Securities	ANZ ETFS Physical Renminbi ETF	Renminbi	AUS	0.57
ZUSD	ANZ/ETF Securities	ANZ ETFS Physical US Dollar ETF	US Dollar	AUS	0.45
ZYUS	ANZ/ETF Securities	ANZ ETFS S&P 500 High Yield Low Volatility ETF	S&P 500 Low Volatility High Dividend Index	AUS	0.35
ZOZI	ANZ/ETF Securities	ANZ ETFS S&P/ASX 100 ETF	S&P/ASX 100 Index	AUS	0.24
ZYAU	ANZ/ETF Securities	ANZ ETFS S&P/ASX 300 High Yield Plus ETF	S&P/ASX Shareholder Yield Index	AUS	0.35
IHCB	BlackRock	iShares Core Global Corporate Bond (AUD Hedged) ETF	Bloomberg Barclays Global Aggregate Corporate Bond Index (AUD Hedged)	US	0.26
IHHY	BlackRock	iShares Global High Yield Bond (AUD Hedged) ETF	Markit iBoxx Global Developed Markets Liquid High Yield Capped Index (AUD Hedged)	US	0.56
IHEB	BlackRock	iShares J.P. Morgan USD Emerging Markets Bond (AUD Hedged) ETF	J.P. Morgan EMBI Global Core Index (AUD Hedged)	US	0.51
IHWL	BlackRock	iShares Core MSCI World All Cap (AUD Hedged) ETF	MSCI World Investable Market Index 100% Hedged to AUD	AUS	0.12
IESG	BlackRock	iShares Core MSCI Australia ESG ETF	MSCI Australia IMI Custom ESG Leaders Index (AUD)	AUS	0.09
IWLD	BlackRock	iShares Core MSCI World ex Australia ESG Leaders ETF	MSCI World Ex Australia Custom ESG Leaders Index	AUS	0.09
WDMF	BlackRock	iShares Edge MSCI World Multifactor ETF	MSCI World Diversified Multiple-Factor (AUD) Index	AUS	0.35
MVOL	BlackRock	iShares Edge MSCI Australia Minimum Volatility ETF	MSCI Australia IMI Select Minimum Volatility (AUD) Index	AUS	0.30
AUMF	BlackRock	iShares Edge MSCI Australia Multifactor ETF	MSCI Australia IMI Diversified Multiple-Factor (AUD) Index	AUS	0.30
IAA	BlackRock	iShares Asia 50 ETF	S&P Asia 50	AUS	0.5
IZZ	BlackRock	iShares China Large-Cap ETF	FTSE China 25	AUS	0.72
IVV	BlackRock	iShares Core S&P 500	S&P 500	AUS	0.04
IJH	BlackRock	iShares Core S&P MidCap 400	S&P Midcap 400	AUS	0.07
IJR	BlackRock	iShares Core S&P SmallCap 600	S&P SmallCap 600	AUS	0.07
IEU	BlackRock	iShares Europe ETF	S&P Europe 350	AUS	0.6
IHOO	BlackRock	iShares Global 100 AUD Hedged	S&P Global 100 Hedged AUD	AUS	0.46
IOO	BlackRock	iShares Global 100 ETF	S&P Global 100	AUS	0.4
IXI	BlackRock	iShares Global Consumer Staples ETF	S&P Global Consumer Staples	AUS	0.48
IXJ	BlackRock	iShares Global Healthcare ETF	S&P Global Healthcare	AUS	0.48
IXP	BlackRock	iShares Global Telecom ETF	S&P Global Telecommunications	US	0.48
IOZ	BlackRock	iShares MSCI Australia 200 ETF	MSCI Australia 200	AUS	0.05
IBK	BlackRock	iShares MSCI BRIC ETF	MSCI BRIC	US	0.69
IVE	BlackRock	iShares MSCI EAFE ETF	MSCI EAFE	AUS	0.34
IEM	BlackRock	iShares MSCI Emerging Markets ETF	MSCI Emerging Markets	AUS	0.69
IHK	BlackRock	iShares MSCI Hong Kong ETF	MSCI Hong Kong	US	0.53
IJP	BlackRock	iShares MSCI Japan ETF	MSCI Japan	AUS	0.53
ISG	BlackRock	iShares MSCI Singapore ETF	MSCI Singapore	US	0.53
IKO	BlackRock	iShares MSCI South Korea Capped ETF	MSCI South Korea Capped Index Fund	AUS	0.61
ITW	BlackRock	iShares MSCI Taiwan ETF	MSCI Taiwan	AUS	0.61
IRU	BlackRock	iShares Russell 2000 ETF	Russell 2000	US	0.20
IHVV	BlackRock	iShares S&P 500 AUD Hedged	S&P 500 Hedged AUD	AUS	0.13
ILC	BlackRock	iShares S&P/ASX 20 ETF	S&P/ASX 20	AUS	0.24
IHD	BlackRock	iShares S&P/ASX Dividend Opportunities Fund ETF	S&P/ASX Dividend Opportunities Index	AUS	0.3
ISO	BlackRock	iShares S&P/ASX Small Ordinaries ETF	S&P/ASX Small Ordinaries	AUS	0.55
IAF	BlackRock	iShares UBS Composite Bond ETF	Bloomberg AusBond Composite Index	AUS	0.24
ILB	BlackRock	iShares UBS Government Inflation ETF	Bloomberg AusBond Inflation Government Index	AUS	0.26
IGB	BlackRock	iShares UBS Treasury ETF	Bloomberg AusBond Treasury Index	AUS	0.26
CETF	Van Eck Global	VanEck FTSE China A50 ETF	FTSE China A50 Index	AUS	0.60
CLNE	Van Eck Global	VanEck Global Clean Energy ETF	S&P Global Clean Energy Select Index	AUS	0.65
CNEW	Van Eck Global	VanEck China New Economy ETF	MarketGrader China New Economy Index	AUS	0.95
DVDY	Van Eck Global	VanEck Morningstar Australian Moat Income ETF	Morningstar® Australia Dividend Yield Focus Index™	AUS	0.35
EBND	Van Eck Global	VanEck Emerging Income Opportunities Active ETF (Managed Fund)	N/A	AUS	0.95
EMKT	Van Eck Global	VanEck MSCI Multifactor Emerging Markets Equity ETF	MSCI Emerging Markets Diversified Multiple-Factor Index (AUD)	AUS	0.69
ESGI	Van Eck Global	VanEck MSCI International Sustainable Equity ETF	MSCI World ex Australia ex Fossil Fuel Select SRI and Low Carbon Capped Index	AUS	0.55
ESPO	Van Eck Global	VanEck Video Gaming and eSports ETF	MVIS® Global Video Gaming & eSports Index	AUS	0.55
FLOT	Van Eck Global	VanEck Australian Floating Rate ETF	The Bloomberg AusBond Credit FRN 0+ Yr Index	AUS	0.22
GCAP	Van Eck Global	VanEck Bentham Global Capital Securities Active ETF (Managed Fund)	N/A	AUS	0.59
GDX	Van Eck Global	VanEck Gold Miners ETF	NYSE Arca Gold Miners Index (AUD)	AUS	0.53
GOAT	Van Eck Global	VanEck Morningstar International Wide Moat ETF	Morningstar® Developed Markets ex-Australia Wide Moat Focus Index™	AUS	0.55
GRNV	Van Eck Global	VanEck MSCI Australian Sustainable Equity ETF	MSCI Australia IMI Select SRI Screened Index	AUS	0.35
HLTH	Van Eck Global	VanEck Global Healthcare Leaders ETF	MarketGrader Developed Markets (ex-Australia) Health Care Index	AUS	0.45
IFRA	Van Eck Global	VanEck FTSE Global Infrastructure (Hedged) ETF	FTSE Developed Core Infrastructure 50/50 Hedged into Australian Dollars Index	AUS	0.52
MOAT	Van Eck Global	VanEck Morningstar Wide Moat ETF	Morningstar® Wide Moat Focus NR AUD Index™	AUS	0.49
MVA	Van Eck Global	VanEck Australian Property ETF	MVIS Australia A-REITs Index	AUS	0.35
MVB	Van Eck Global	VanEck Australian Banks ETF	MVIS Australia Banks Index	AUS	0.28
MVE	Van Eck Global	VanEck S&P/ASX MidCap ETF	S&P/ASX Midcap 50 Index	AUS	0.45
MVR	Van Eck Global	VanEck Australian Resources ETF	MVIS Australia Resources Index	AUS	0.35
MVS	Van Eck Global	VanEck Small Companies Masters ETF	MVIS Australia Small-Cap Dividend Payers Index	AUS	0.49
MVW	Van Eck Global	VanEck Australian Equal Weight ETF	MVIS Australia Equal Weight Index	AUS	0.35
PLUS	Van Eck Global	VanEck Australian Corporate Bond Plus ETF	iBoxx AUD Corporates Yield Plus Mid Price Index	AUS	0.32
QUAL	Van Eck Global	VanEck MSCI International Quality ETF	MSCI World ex Australia Quality Index	AUS	0.40
QHAL	Van Eck Global	VanEck MSCI International Quality (Hedged) ETF	MSCI World ex Australia Quality 100% Hedged to AUD Index	AUS	0.43
QSML	Van Eck Global	VanEck MSCI International Small Companies Quality ETF	MSCI World ex Australia Small Cap Quality 150 Index	AUS	0.59
REIT	Van Eck Global	VanEck FTSE International Property (Hedged) ETF	FTSE EPRA Nareit Developed ex Australia Rental Index AUD Hedged	AUS	0.43
SUBD	Van Eck Global	VanEck Australian Subordinated Debt ETF	iBoxx AUD Investment Grade Subordinated Debt Mid Price Index	AUS	0.29
VLUE	Van Eck Global	VanEck MSCI International Value ETF	MSCI World ex Australia Enhanced Value Top 250 Select Index	AUS	0.40
RVL	Russell Investments	Russell Australia Value ETF	Russell Australian Value Index	AUS	0.34
RGB	Russell Investments	Russell Australian Government Bond ETF	Australian Government Bonds	AUS	0.24
RARI	Russell Investments	Russell Australian Responsible Investment ETF	Russell Australia ESG High Dividend Index	AUS	0.45
RCB	Russell Investments	Russell Australian Select Corporate Bond ETF	Australian Corporate Bonds	AUS	0.28
RSM	Russell Investments	Russell Australian Semi-Government Bond ETF	Australian Semi-Government Bonds	AUS	0.26
RDV	Russell Investments	Russell High Dividend Australian Shares ETF	Russell High Dividend Index	AUS	0.34
STW	State Street	SPDR 200 Fund	S&P/ASX 200	AUS	0.13
SFY	State Street	SPDR 50 Fund	S&P/ASX 50	AUS	0.28
DJRE	State Street	SPDR Dow Jones Global Real Estate Fund	SPDR Dow Jones Global Select Real Estate Securities Index	AUS	0.5
SYI	State Street	SPDR MSCI Australia Select High Dividend Yield Fund	MSCI Australian Select High Dividend Yield Index	AUS	0.35
SPY	State Street	SPDR S&P 500 ETF Trust	S&P 500	US	0.09
WEMG	State Street	SPDR S&P Emerging Markets Carbon Control Fund	S&P Emerging LargeMidCap Carbon Control Index (AUD)	AUS	0.65
WDIV	State Street	SPDR S&P Global Dividend Fund	SPDR S&P Global Dividend Aristocrats Fund	AUS	0.5
WXHG	State Street	SPDR S&P World Ex Australia (Hedged) Fund	S&P Developed ex Australia LargeMidCap Hedged AUD Index	AUS	0.48
WXOZ	State Street	SPDR S&P World Ex Australia Fund	S&P Developed ex Australia LargeMidCap AUD Index.	AUS	0.42
OZF	State Street	SPDR S&P/ASX 200 Financials ex A-REITS Fund	S&P/ASX 200 X-A-REITs	AUS	0.4
SLF	State Street	SPDR S&P/ASX 200 Listed Property Fund	S&P/ASX 200 A-REITs	AUS	0.4
OZR	State Street	SPDR S&P/ASX 200 Resources Fund	S&P/ASX 200 Resources	AUS	0.4
BOND	State Street	SPDR S&P/ASX Australian Bond Fund	S&P/ASX Australian Fixed Income Index	AUS	0.24
GOVT	State Street	SPDR S&P/ASX Australian Government Bond Fund	S&P /ASX Bond Index	AUS	0.22
SSO	State Street	SPDR S&P/ASX Small Ordinaries Fund	S&P/ASX Small Ordinaries	AUS	0.5
VEU	Vanguard	Vanguard All-World ex-US Shares Index	FTSE All-World ex US Index	US	0.04
VAF	Vanguard	Vanguard Australian Fixed Interest Index	Bloomberg AusBond Composite Index	AUS	0.2
VGB	Vanguard	Vanguard Australian Government Bond Index ETF	Bloomberg AusBond Government Index	AUS	0.2
VAP	Vanguard	Vanguard Australian Property Securities Index ETF	S&P/ASX 300 A-REITs	AUS	0.23
VHY	Vanguard	Vanguard Australian Shares High Yield ETF	FTSE ASFA Australian High Dividend Yield Index	AUS	0.25
VAS	Vanguard	Vanguard Australian Shares Index	S&P/ASX 300	AUS	0.07
VGE	Vanguard	Vanguard FTSE Emerging Markets Shares	FTSE Emerging Index (in AUD)	AUS	0.48
VLC	Vanguard	Vanguard MSCI Australian Large Companies Index	MSCI Large Cap Index	AUS	0.2
VSO	Vanguard	Vanguard MSCI Australian Small Companies Index	MSCI Small Cap Index	AUS	0.3
VGS	Vanguard	Vanguard MSCI Index International Series	MSCI World ex-Australia	AUS	0.18
VGAD	Vanguard	Vanguard MSCI Index International Series (Hedged)	MSCI World ex-Australia (AUD hedged)	AUS	0.21
VTS	Vanguard	Vanguard US Total Market Shares Index	CRSP US Broad Market Index	US	0.03
MOGL	Montgomery	Montgomery Global Equities Fund	N/A	US	1.32
VEQ	Vanguard	Vanguard FTSE Europe Shares ETF	FTSE Developed Europe All Cap Index (in AUD)	AUS	0.35
VACF	Vanguard	Vanguard Australian Corporate Fixed Interest Index Fund	Bloomberg AusBond Credit 0+ Yr Index	AUS	0.26
VAE	Vanguard	Vanguard FTSE Asia ex Japan Shares Index ETF	FTSE Asia Pacific ex Japan Australia and New Zealand Net Index	AUS	0.4
VBLD	Vanguard	Vanguard Global Infrastructure Index Fund	FTSE Developed Core Infrastructure Index	AUS	0.47
VBND	Vanguard	Vanguard Global Aggregate Bond Index Fund (Hedged)	Bloomberg Barclays Global Aggregate Float-Adjusted and Scaled Index (AUD hedged)	AUS	0.2
VCF	Vanguard	Vanguard International Credit Securities Index Fund (Hedged)	Bloomberg Barclays Global Aggregate Corporate and Government-Related Scaled Index (AUD hedged)	AUS	0.3
VEFI	Vanguard	Vanguard Ethically Conscious Global Aggregate Bond Index Fund	Bloomberg Barclays MSCI Global Aggregate SRI Exclusion Float Adjusted Index (AUD hedged)	AUS	0.26
VESG	Vanguard	Vanguard Ethically Conscious International Shares Index Fund	FTSE Developed ex Australia ex Non-Renewable Energy/Vice Products/Weapons	AUS	0.18
VETH	Vanguard	Vanguard Ethically Conscious Australian Shares Index Fund	FTSE Australia 300 Choice Index	AUS	0.16
VGMF	Vanguard	Vanguard Global Multi-Factor Active ETF (managed fund)	FTSE Developed All-Cap Index (in AUD)	AUS	0.33
VIF	Vanguard	Vanguard International Fixed Interest Index Fund (Hedged)	Bloomberg Barclays Global Treasury Scaled Index (AUD hedged)	AUS	0.2
VISM	Vanguard	Vanguard International Small Companies Index Fund	MSCI World ex-Australia Small Cap Index	AUS	0.32
VMIN	Vanguard	Vanguard Global Minimum Volatility Active ETF (managed fund)	FTSE Global All Cap Index (AUD hedged)	AUS	0.28
VVLU	Vanguard	Vanguard Global Value Equity Active ETF (managed fund)	FTSE Developed All-Cap Index (in AUD)	AUS	0.28
BEST	ETF Shares	ETFS US Quality ETF	Solactive US Quality Cash Flow Index	AUS	0.29
HUGE	ETF Shares	ETFS US Technology ETF	Solactive US Technology Index	AUS	0.19
WWWW	ETF Shares	ETFS Magnificent 7+ ETF	Solactive Magnificent 7+ Index	AUS	0.17
CPPR	ETF Shares	ETFS Global Pure Play Copper Miners ETF	BITA Global Copper Miners Equal Weight Index	AUS	0.39
VOLT	ETF Shares	ETFS Global Lithium Miners ETF	BITA Global Lithium Miners Select Index	AUS	0.49

== See also ==
- List of exchange-traded funds
- List of American exchange-traded funds
