= Betashares =

Australian investment management company

- Type: Private, Employee owned
- Industry: Investment management Wealth management
- Founded: 2009; 17 years ago
- Founders: Alex Vynokur, David Nathanson
- Headquarters: Sydney, Australia
- Key people: Alex Vynokur (CEO); Jason Gellert (CFO)
- Products: 102 Exchange-traded funds including Indices, Equities, Fixed Income, Commodities, FX, Active
- AUM: A$80 billion (2026)
- Number of employees: 230 (2026)
- Website: www.betashares.com.au

Betashares is a diversified Australian financial services firm. Serving more than one million investors and with over $80 billion in assets under management, Betashares offers Australia’s largest range of ETFs, in addition to managed accounts, superannuation and innovative investing solutions through its online investment platform, Betashares Direct . It is owned and managed by its Australian based management team and has strategic shareholdings by Singapore's sovereign wealth investment company Temasek Holdings and TA Associates.

== History ==
Betashares was founded in 2009. It launched its first exchange-traded funds (ETFs) in December 2010. The company later added currency ETFs, actively managed bond ETFs, and thematic funds to its product line.

In 2021, the U.S. private equity firm TA Associates acquired a minority stake in Betashares.

In September 2023, Betashares entered the Australian superannuation sector through the acquisition of Bendigo and Adelaide Bank’s superannuation business.

In October 2023, the company launched Betashares Direct, an investment platform aimed at self directed retail investors. The platform launched with ETF trading and was expanded in 2024 to include other listed securities.

In June 2024, Singapore’s sovereign wealth fund Temasek agreed to acquire a minority stake in Betashares, investing up to A$300 million. Temasek joined existing shareholders including TA Associates and Betashares staff.

By June 2025, Betashares reported that its total funds under management had surpassed A$50 billion.

In July 2025, Betashares acquired financial media and education company Equity Mates, founded in 2017. The acquisition was intended to increase the company's presence in the retail investment market. The co-founders remained with the company, which continues to operate under its existing brand.

Also in July 2025, Betashares announced the formation of Trellia Wealth Partners, a managed accounts business created through the merger of its portfolio services with those investment consultancy InvestSense. Trellia launched with approximately A$8 billion in funds under management and provides index-based and customized portfolios.

Later in 2025, Betashares launched Betashares Private Capital, a division focused on private market investments. The division partnered with U.S.-based Cliffwater LLC to provide private credit products for wholesale investors.

== Products and ETF Range ==
Betashares provides exchange-traded funds (ETFs) covering equities, fixed income, cash, commodities, and digital assets.

The company’s equity ETFs include broad-market index funds and thematic products focusing on sectors such as technology, sustainability, cyber-security and robotics.

Betashares also offers fixed income ETFs, including funds providing exposure to government bonds, corporate bonds, and hybrid securities. Some of these are actively managed in partnership with external managers, including Franklin Templeton.

In the digital assets category, Betashares manages products that provide exposure to cryptocurrencies such as Bitcoin, Ethereum and related industries, such as the Crypto Innovators ETF (CRYP).

The firm's funds include the Betashares Australia 200 ETF (A200) and the Betashares Nasdaq 100 ETF (NDQ). Betashares Australian High Interest Cash ETF (AAA), and the Betashares Global Sustainability Leaders ETF (ETHI).

Betashares also offers managed portfolios for self-directed investors through its Betashares Direct platform, and managed accounts for advisers through wealth platforms.

== Political lobbying ==
In January 2026, Betashares founder and CEO Alex Vynokur led a group of more than 100 Australian business identities lobbying the Australian Federal Government to conduct a Royal Commission into the 2025 Bondi Beach shootings and broader issues of antisemitism and security failures.

== See also ==
- List of Australian exchange-traded funds
- Exchange-traded fund
- Gold exchange-traded fund
