= SPDR =

Family of exchange-traded funds (ETFs) managed by State Street Global Advisors

SPDR funds (pronounced "spider") are a family of exchange-traded funds (ETFs) traded in the United States, Europe, Mexico and Asia-Pacific and managed by State Street Global Advisors (SSGA). Informally, they are also known as Spyders or Spiders. SPDR is a trademark of Standard and Poor's Financial Services LLC, a subsidiary of S&P Global. The name is an acronym for the first member of the family, the Standard & Poor's Depositary Receipts, now the SPDR S&P 500 Trust ETF, which is designed to track the S&P 500 stock market index. SPDR is the third largest ETF provider, behind iShares and Vanguard.

The SPDR S&P 500 Trust is the largest ETF in the world by total assets under management. SSGA also manages the SPDR Gold Shares, the largest commodity based ETF in the world.

The funds are formulated as unit investment trusts. In 2007, SSGA rebranded its other United States ETFs as SPDRs, including the StreetTRACKS family and its other flagship ETF shares, the DOW DIAMONDS, that tracks the Dow Jones Industrial Average. This move united all U.S. ETFs managed by SSGA, a total of 23 at that time, under a single brand.

== Other funds ==
In 1995, Mid-Cap SPDRs were launched by the Bank of New York to track Standard & Poor's S&P 400 index of middle-market equity shares.

The DIAMONDS were developed, like the original SPDR, by SSGA in cooperation with the American Stock Exchange. DOW DIAMOND shares are designed to track the Dow Jones Industrial Average.

In 1998, SSGA and Merrill Lynch introduced the Sector Spiders, which now consist of ten funds which follow the eleven GICS sectors of the S&P 500. Because the S&P 500 contains only four telecommunications companies, those companies are a part of the information technology SPDR, and that one fund represents those two sectors.

SSGA also launched a number of index-based ETFs under the brand StreetTRACKS. These were renamed SPDRs in 2007.

SSGA also manages ETFs that are sold on exchanges outside the United States.

In Australia SSGA manages three SPDR branded ETFs. They are listed on the Australian Securities Exchange and are the following:

- S&P/ASX 50 Fund (50 top market cap stocks)
- S&P/ASX 200 Fund (200 top market cap stocks)
- S&P/ASX 200 A-REIT Property Fund (200 Listed Property Fund)

== Selected funds ==
- Dow Jones Global Real Estate ETF
- Dow Jones Global Titans ETF
- Dow Jones International Real Estate ETF
- Dow Jones REIT ETF
- Dow Jones STOXX 50 ETF
- Dow Jones EURO STOXX 50 ETF
- Dow Diamonds (SGX:D07) - Tracks Dow Jones Industrial Average
- S&P 500 ETF (SGX:S27) - Tracks S&P 500 Index
- S&P Biotech ETF
- S&P BRIC 40 ETF
- S&P China ETF
- S&P Dividend ETF
- S&P Pharmaceuticals ETF
- S&P Retail ETF
- S&P Homebuilders ETF
- S&P Emerging Asia Pacific ETF
- S&P Emerging Markets ETF
- S&P Emerging Markets Small Cap ETF
- S&P MidCap 400 ETF
- S&P International Small Cap ETF
- S&P International Consumer Discretionary Sector ETF
- S&P International Consumer Staples Sector ETF
- S&P International Dividend ETF
- S&P International Energy Sector ETF
- S&P International Financial Sector ETF
- S&P International Health Care Sector ETF
- S&P International Industrial Sector ETF
- S&P International Materials Sector ETF
- S&P International Technology Sector ETF
- S&P International Telecommunications Sector ETF
- S&P International Utilities Sector ETF
- S&P Metals and Mining ETF
- S&P Oil & Gas Equipment & Services ETF
- S&P Oil & Gas Exploration & Production ETF
- S&P Semiconductor ETF
- S&P World ex-US ETF
- Barclays Capital 1-3 Month T-Bill ETF
- Barclays Capital Aggregate Bond ETF
- Barclays Capital Convertible Secs
- Barclays Capital Municipal Bond ETF
- Barclays Capital Short Term Municipal Bond ETF
- Barclays Capital Short Term International Treasury Bond ETF
- Barclays Capital High Yield Bond ETF
- Barclays Capital Intermediate Term Credit Bond ETF
- Barclays Capital Intermediate Term Treasury ETF
- Barclays Capital International Treasury Bond ETF
- Barclays Capital Long Term Credit Bond ETF
- Barclays Capital Mortgage Backed Bond ETF
- BarCap ST High Yield Bond ETF
- Barclays Capital TIPS ETF
- Consumer Discretionary Select Sector SPDR Fund
- Consumer Staples Select Sector SPDR Fund
- DB International Government Inflation-Protected Bond ETF
- Energy Select Sector SPDR Fund
- Financial Select Sector SPDR Fund
- FTSE Greater China ETF (HKEx:3073)
- Gold Shares (HKEx:2840) (SGX:O87)
- Health Care Select Sector SPDR Fund
- Industrial Select Sector SPDR Fund
- KBW Bank ETF
- KBW Capital Markets ETF
- KBW Regional Banking ETF
- KBW Insurance ETF
- Materials Select Sector SPDR Fund
- Morgan Stanley Technology ETF
- MSCI ACWI ex-US ETF
- Russell/Nomura PRIME Japan ETF
- Straits Times Index ETF (SGX:ES3)
- Technology Select SPDR Fund
- Utilities Select Sector SPDR Fund

== See also ==
- List of exchange-traded funds
