= IShares =

Family of exchange-traded funds (ETFs) managed by BlackRock

iShares
- Product type: Exchange-traded fund and index mutual fund
- Current owner: BlackRock
- Country: United States
- Markets: Worldwide
- Website: www.ishares.com

iShares is a collection of exchange-traded funds (ETFs) and index mutual funds managed by BlackRock, which acquired the brand and business from Barclays in 2009. The first iShares ETFs were known as World Equity Benchmark Shares (WEBS) but have since been rebranded.

Most iShares funds track a bond or stock market index, although some are actively managed. Stock exchanges listing iShares funds include the London Stock Exchange, American Stock Exchange, New York Stock Exchange, BATS Exchange, Hong Kong Stock Exchange, Mexican Stock Exchange, Toronto Stock Exchange, Australian Securities Exchange, B3 (stock exchange), and a number of European and Asian stock exchanges. iShares is the largest issuer of ETFs in the US and globally, and also manages index mutual funds.

== History ==
In 1993, State Street, in cooperation with American Stock Exchange, launched Standard & Poor's Depositary Receipts (NYSE Arca: SPY) (now the 'SPDR S&P 500'), which was traded in real time and tracked the S&P 500 index. This was the first ETF to trade in the United States, and it continues to trade to this day.

In response, Morgan Stanley launched a series of ETFs called WEBS which tracked its MSCI foreign stock market indices. WEBS, an acronym for World Equity Benchmark Shares, were developed in cooperation with Barclays Global Investors, the fund manager. Unlike the SPDR fund that was a unit investment trust, the underlying vehicle of the WEBS were mutual funds.

In 2000, Barclays put a significant strategic effort behind growing the ETF market, launching over 40 new funds, branded as iShares, supported by an extensive education and marketing effort. The effort was led by Lee Kranefuss, who worked closely with the inventor of the ETF, Nate Most, at that time Chairman of the WEBs Board and an adviser to Barclays on the iShares effort. Most had retired from the American Stock Exchange some years earlier and settled in California. WEBS were soon renamed the iShares MSCI Series as part of that program.

On November 7, 2006, iShares announced the purchase of the INDEXCHANGE ETF unit of HypoVereinsbank for €240 million. This solidified the iShares position in Europe as the leading ETF provider.

Barclays added currency hedging features to the Canadian iShares, to distinguish them from US products in response to the elimination of limits on foreign holdings by Canadians in an RRSP. Barclays hedges currency changes in the Canadian - US exchange rate for the S&P 500 and the MSCI EAFE.

On March 16, 2009, Barclays confirmed that it was planning to sell iShares to CVC Capital Partners, a private equity firm that had agreed to pay more than $4 billion. However, under a 45-day "go shop" clause, a later bid by BlackRock was announced on 11 June 2009 for the whole of the parent division Barclays Global Investors including iShares, in a mixed cash-stock deal worth around US$13.5 billion (37.8 million shares of common stock and US$6.6 billion in cash).

iShares has increased the number of its "iShares Core" funds.

iShares is among the asset managers with the largest amount of sustainable fund flows in 2020 with $14.5 billion as of September 30, 2020.

== See also ==
- ETF Securities
- IPath
- List of exchange-traded funds
- PowerShares
- SPDR
