= SPDR S&P 500 ETF Trust =

US exchange-traded fund

The SPDR S&P 500 ETF Trust, commonly known by its ticker symbol SPY (NYSE Arca: SPY), is an exchange-traded fund (ETF) that seeks to track, before expenses, the price and yield performance of the S&P 500 by holding, as far as practicable, a portfolio of common stocks included in the index, with portfolio weights that substantially correspond to the index. Launched on January 22, 1993, SPY was the first ETF listed in the United States. It is part of the SPDR family of funds.

== Name ==
SPDR originated as an acronym for Standard & Poor's Depositary Receipts, the name under which the product first traded. The acronym is commonly pronounced "spider". The trust was known as SPDR Trust Series 1 before January 27, 2010, as SPDR S&P 500 ETF Trust before January 26, 2026, and as State Street SPDR S&P 500 ETF Trust thereafter. SPDR, SPDRs, and Standard & Poor's Depositary Receipts are registered trademarks of Standard & Poor's Financial Services LLC and are licensed for use by S&P Dow Jones Indices LLC and sublicensed for use by State Street Global Advisors Funds Distributors LLC.

== History ==
The fund originated from a collaboration between the American Stock Exchange (AMEX) and State Street to create an exchange-traded security tracking the S&P 500. Nathan Most, senior vice president for product development at the AMEX, and Steven Bloom, its vice president of product development, assembled a team from the exchange, State Street Bank, Spear, Leeds & Kellogg, and Orrick, Herrington & Sutcliffe to develop the product.

The trust commenced operations on January 22, 1993, with an initial issuance of 150,000 units, and its units first traded on the AMEX on January 29, 1993, under the ticker symbol SPY. It was the first ETF in the United States.

In February 2024, SPY became the first ETF to reach $500 billion in assets under management. In October 2024, it became the first ETF to surpass $600 billion in assets. In February 2025, Vanguard's S&P 500 ETF (NYSE Arca: VOO) overtook SPY as the world's largest ETF by assets.

== Structure and expiration ==
SPY is structured as a unit investment trust (UIT), an investment company that does not have a portfolio manager or board of directors. The trustee of the trust is State Street Global Advisors Trust Company and the sponsor is PDR Services LLC, a subsidiary of Intercontinental Exchange. The fund's gross expense ratio is 0.0945%; its CUSIP is 78462F103 and its ISIN is US78462F1030.

As a result of being structured as an UIT, it cannot exist in perpetuity and must have an expiry date. According to the trust's legal structure, there are 11 millennials living in the United States upon whose lives the life of the trust is pegged. Eight of the 11 individuals chosen had some connection to the employees of the AMEX who first founded the ETF. SPY will cease to exist on January 22, 2118, or 20 years after the last of the 11 individuals die, whichever comes first.

== Performance ==
Year	Average annual return		
Year	1 year	5 years	10 years
1993	9.78%		
1994	1.15%		
1995	37.23%		
1996	22.67%		
1997 (Note: 9-month period ending September 30, 1997, due to fiscal year change)	29.38%		
1998	8.82%		
1999	27.54%		
2000	13.16%		
2001	−26.60%		
2002	−20.46%		
2003	24.13%		
2004	13.62%		
2005	12.11%		
2006	10.64%		
2007	16.31%	15.29%	6.45%
2008	−21.84%	5.10%	2.98%
2009	−6.90%	0.98%	−0.21%
2010	10.08%	3.03%	−4.79%
2011	1.01%	−1.22%	2.74%
2012	29.96%	1.00%	7.91%
2013	19.09%	9.87%	7.46%
2014	19.57%	15.52%	8.00%
2015	−0.64%	13.18%	6.70%
2016	15.30%	16.21%	7.14%
2017	18.44%	14.07%	7.33%
2018	17.72%	13.80%	11.82%
2019	4.11%	10.70%	13.09%
2020	14.98%	13.99%	13.60%
2021	29.79%	16.72%	16.48%
2022	−15.53%	9.09%	11.56%
2023	21.45%	9.77%	11.77%
2024	24.35%	-	-

Returns of SPY by fiscal year per SEC EDGAR filings. Effective September 30, 1997, the end of the trust's fiscal year changed from December 31 to September 30. The 5-year and 10-year average annual return results in the table include reinvestment of distributions (typically dividends) from the trust.

== See also ==
- List of exchange-traded funds
- Collective investment scheme
