= United States Oil Fund =

Oil-tracking exchange-traded fund

- Type: Exchange-traded fund
- Traded as: NYSE Arca: USO
- Industry: Investment management
- Founded: April 10, 2006; 20 years ago
- Key people: John Love (President)
- Owner: United States Commodity Funds
- Website: www.uscfinvestments.com/uso

The United States Oil Fund is an exchange-traded fund (ETF) that attempts to track the price of West Texas Intermediate (WTI) Light Sweet Crude Oil. It is distinguished from an exchange-traded note (ETN) since it represents an ownership claim on underlying securities that the fund has packaged. USO invests in oil futures contracts that are traded on regulated futures exchanges.

== Background ==
The United States Oil Fund was founded on April 10, 2006, by Victoria Bay Asset Management, now known as United States Commodity Funds, and the American Stock Exchange. The fund opened on its first day of trading at $68.25 per share. USO's investment objective is to include the changes in percentage terms of its units' net asset value (NAV) in its evaluation of the changes in percentage terms of the spot price of light, sweet crude oil as measured by its price on the New York Mercantile Exchange (NYMEX). Its performance is determined by the price of oil through its oil futures contracts.

== See also ==
- SPDR Gold Shares
- Price of petroleum
