= VanEck =

American investment management firm

Van Eck Associates Corporation
- Trade name: VanEck
- Formerly: Van Eck Global
- Type: Private
- Industry: Investment Management
- Founded: 1955; 71 years ago
- Founder: John van Eck
- Headquarters: New York City, U.S.
- Key people: Jan van Eck (CEO)
- AUM: US$101.9 billion (March 2024)
- Number of employees: 400 (2024)
- Website: www.vaneck.com

VanEck is a global investment management firm headquartered in New York City. The firm is primarily engaged in issuing exchange-traded fund (ETF) products although it also deals with mutual funds and separately managed accounts for institutional investors. It was a pioneer of investing in foreign growth stocks as well as gold investing.

Outside the U.S., the firm has offices in Europe and Asia–Pacific.

In 2024, the United States Securities and Exchange Commission fined the company $1.75 million for paying Dave Portnoy to artificially inflate the value of its exchange-traded fund (ETF) without adequate disclosures.

== Background ==
=== Van Eck Global (1955 to 2016) ===
In 1955, John van Eck founded Van Eck Global, an investment firm that capitalized on the growing international company share market after the opening of Western Europe to US investors in the wake of the Marshall Plan. His father moved to the US from the Netherlands in the early 20th century as an employee of Shell plc to expand its international business.

In 1968, the firm launched one of the first US gold funds, International Investors Gold Fund and moved most of its portfolio into shares of gold mining companies. During the 1970s and up to the mid-1980s, gold experienced a growing market and the firm experienced significant success. The International Investors Gold Fund received large subscriptions and had more than $1 billion in assets under management (AUM). However, after the mid-1980s, the gold market boom ended and the firm's business slowed down. By February 1998, the International Investors Gold Fund had dwindled to $250 million.

In response to the decline of the gold market, the firm started developing its business of investing into emerging markets of Asia in the 1990s. In 1996, the firm signed a joint venture agreement with Shenyin & Wanguo to tap the fund market of mainland China. However the 1997 Asian financial crisis had turned off demand for emerging market funds. One of its funds, the Van Eck Asia Dynasty Fund had its AUM decline from $46.3 million at the end of 1996 to $11.2 million at the end of 1997.

From 1994 to 1998, the firm's AUM dropped 21% from $1.82 billion to $1.44 billion. The price of metal in 1997 had hit a 12-year low. Only its Global Hard Assets Fund had positive returns of 26% for the three years ended December 1997. As a result, the firm was hit by redemptions and its customer base shrunk.

In 2006, the firm decided to enter the ETF business and launched its first ETF product, Market Vectors Gold Miners ETF. It helped investor bet on gold through the stock market rather than directly. It was compared to SPDR Gold Shares which was launched in November 2004 and although it was not as popular, its AUM rose to $5 billion making it one of the firm's biggest successes. By November 2009, the firm had issued more than 20 ETF products which in total reached an AUM of $9.7 billion.

John van Eck died in 2014. He had two sons, Derek and Jan who both worked at VanEck. Derek who was the firm's chief investment officer died unexpectedly in 2010.

=== VanEck (since 2016) ===
In March 2016, the firm announced that from May 2016 onwards, it would be using the brand name VanEck and all businesses and investment offerings would be all under the VanEck brand.

In January 2018, VanEck acquired Think ETF Asset Management, a Dutch ETF issuer for an undisclosed sum. It was done to help expand the firm's business in Europe.

In November 2020, VanEck applied for a China retail fund management licence. It had previously set up an office in Shanghai to provide consulting services. The China Securities Regulatory Commission stated in March 2021 that VanEck wasn't among the top firms when it came to AUM but requested for more information. In April 2023, VanEck terminated its application and let go of more than 10 employees who were supposed to be part of its planned China mutual fund team. However it retained a team of few than 10 to seek a private fund business.

On March 2, 2021, VanEck launched Vectors Social Sentiment ETF on NYSE Arca under the ticker 'BUZZ'. The funds index composed of stocks that are popular on social media. On its first day of trading it had $280 million of inflows making it one of the 12 best debuts on record. However commentators have stated that its top holdings were large companies such as Twitter and Facebook making it similar to an S&P 500 index that focuses on technology. In addition the constituent members were only rebalanced on a monthly basis so companies such as GameStop, AMC and BlackBerry that had trading frenzies in January that year would not appear. The fund manager could also ignore the index if he saw fit.

VanEck has made multiple attempts to launch VanEck Bitcoin Trust, a spot Bitcoin ETF that is exchange-listed. However, in November 2021, the U.S. Securities and Exchange Commission (SEC) rejected the application citing worries over the potential that fraud in the cryptocurrency market will reach regulated exchanges. In March 2023, its application was denied for a third time. On January 11, 2024, the SEC approved VanEck VanEck Bitcoin Trust and it started trading on the Chicago Board Options Exchange under the ticker 'HODL'. The SEC approved VanEck's ethereum ETF, the VanEck Ethereum ETF, shortly thereafter and it began trading on July 23, 2024. In January 2026, it launched a spot Avalanche ETF, which trades on Nasdaq under the ticker VAVX.

In December 2022, VanEck liquidated its Russia ETF products as a result of the Russian invasion of Ukraine. Sanctions had been imposed on Russian companies, meaning they could not be traded as single stocks or within ETFs in the west.

Jan van Eck is currently the firm's chief executive officer and the firm is currently owned by him and his family.

== Controversy ==
In 2024, VanEck paid the United States Securities and Exchange Commission a $1.75 million USD settlement for failing to disclose a social media influencer's role during its exchange-traded fund (ETF) launch. The SEC claimed that the investment management firm privately paid Dave Portnoy of Barstool Sports to promote the ETF before its launch. However, the firm broke disclosure laws by failing to disclose the arrangement to the SEC. VanEck did not inform its fund overseers or the ETF's supervision board about its payments to Portnoy.
