= August 2013 NASDAQ flash freeze =

For three hours on August 22, 2013, trading was halted on the Nasdaq Stock Market. Trading on the exchange stopped at 12:14 pm and resumed at 3:25 pm, with 35 minutes left of trading for the day. One week after the trading halt NASDAQ OMX credited the freeze to an overloading of the Securities Information Processor (SIP) caused by reconnection issues with the New York Stock Exchange Arca. The freeze received substantial media coverage and generated discussions on the security of increasingly technologically advanced stock exchanges. The event coined the term "flash freeze" following the earlier "flash crash" on May 6, 2010.

Throughout the freeze the Nasdaq composite remained at 3631.17. Following the reopening of the market it rose, closing at 3,638.71, 1.1% higher. Shares of the Nasdaq exchange closed 3.42% down following the freeze.

== Summary of events ==
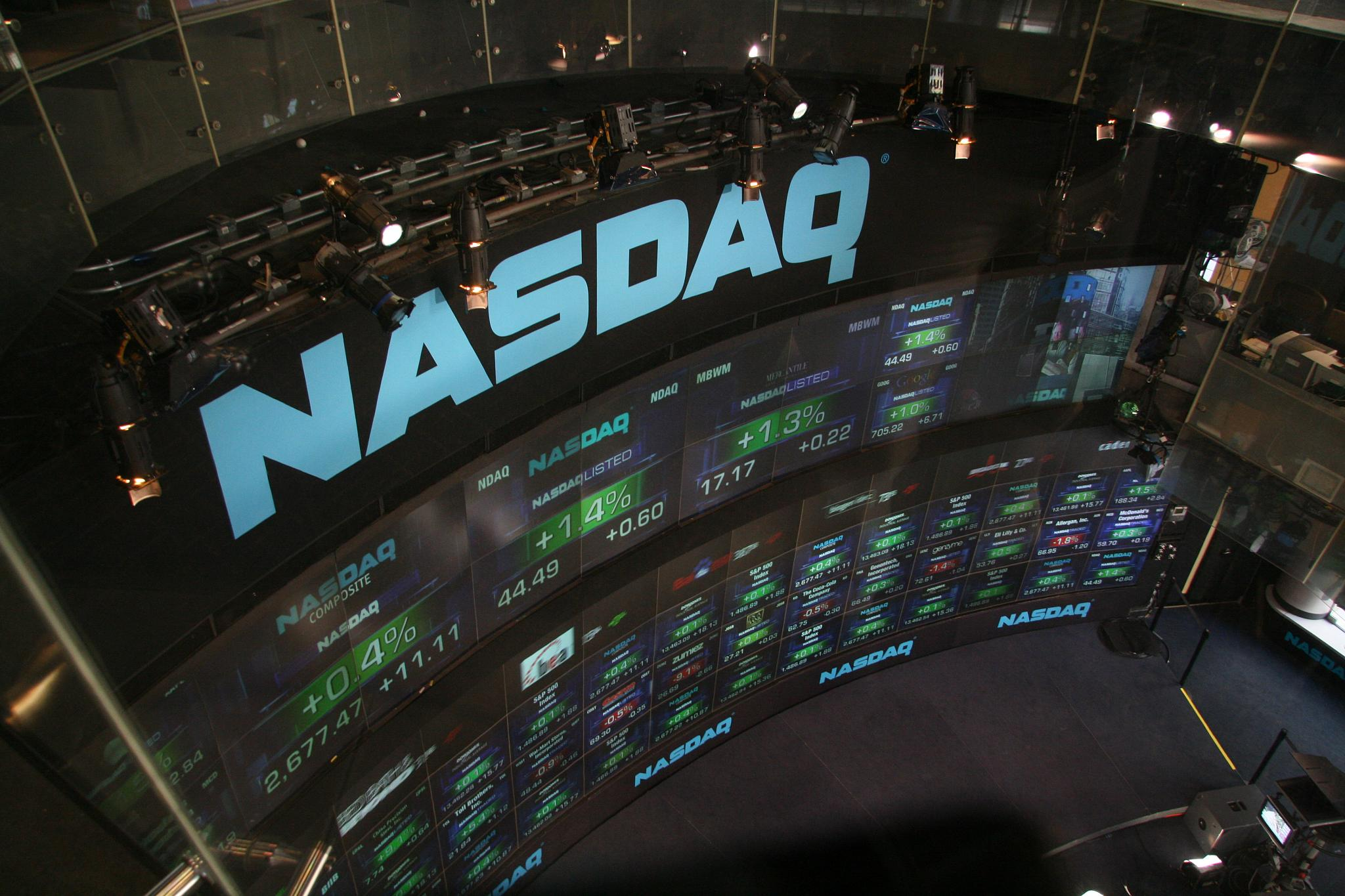
A daily NASDAQ display (taken in 2007).

At 10:53 am New York Stock Exchange (NYSE) Arca could not connect to the SIP after multiple attempts. Subsequently, Nasdaq declared ‘self help’ for Arca. This was revoked at 11:09 am, suggesting that the issue with Arca had been resolved. At 12:14 pm a technical issue impacted price quote distribution. This refers to be ability of the exchange to accurately provide prices of securities that are being traded. At 12:20 pm, all trading was halted on the Nasdaq exchange. There was a subsequent trading halt placed on ‘Tape C’ stocks - Nasdaq listed stocks which may be traded on other exchanges, as quotes could not be provided for those securities. Unlike some purposeful trading halts, options trading did not continue during the flash freeze. In a statement, Nasdaq claimed that the initial cause of the outage was identified and resolved within 30 minutes and that the additional outage time was to ensure that there would be a stable reopening of the market. Test trades began at 2:45 pm and trading officially resumed at 3:25 pm. It was later reported that trades in ‘dark pools’ on Nasdaq listed securities continued in a limited manner past 12:14 pm when trading was halted, until approximately 1:15 pm.

Multiple "dark pool" trading platforms were also shut down during the freeze, and some did not reopen until the follow day, such as Sigma X, a dark pool operated by Goldman Sachs Group Inc. Dark pools operated by other prominent banks and trading firms such as Wells Fargo and Citadel LLC were also non operational for periods of the freeze. These dark pools are not the jurisdiction of the Nasdaq or the NYSE but are reliant on accurate quotes being issued on stocks listed on either exchange and therefore cannot operate when Nasdaq stocks cannot be traded.

== Cause ==
Prior to a public statement made by Nasdaq OMX released on the evening of August 22, there was speculation in financial markets as to the cause of the outage. Some media outlets suggested that the outage was caused by a coding error, while others speculated that hacking could have been the cause.

The cause of the outage was identified as being a capacity issue with the Nasdaq SIP. A capacity assessment had been run on the SIP in January 2013 which found that each of the 50 ports in the system could tolerate 10,000 items per second, meaning the whole SIP had a capacity of 500,000 items per second. On August 22, 2013, the NYSE Arca system sent multiple sequences to Nasdaq which consumed a large amount of the system's capacity. The SIP then received quote for inaccurate symbols, the few characters which are used to represent a security on an exchange, from NYSE Arca. This resulted in the SIP generating a numerous quote rejects which further absorbed capacity of the SIP. Every connect and disconnect sequence sent by NYSE Arca to the SIP resulted in over 26000 updates, per port per second. This enormously overwhelmed the Nasdaq SIP and resulted in a system shut down to ensure fairness in the market and prevent further overloading. Nasdaq stated that the volume of activity, per port, per second, at the time of the freeze, was 26 times that of a usual trading day.

== NASDAQ Response ==
On August 22, 2013, NASDAQ OMX released a brief statement citing a connectivity issue between an exchange participant and the SIP as the catalyst for the inability to distribute quotes. The "exchange participant", later named as NYSE Arca was not specified in the initial statement. It was stated that the initial error was identified and resolved within 30 minutes and that the subsequent outage time was spent coordinating with regulators and stakeholders.

On August 29, 2013, NASDAQ OMX issued a statement detailing the causes of the trading halt, as well as admitting a degree of responsibility for the outage. The statement accredited a number of convergent issues as the cause of the outage, some of which NASDAQ OMX took responsibility for. Of these issues they stated that “we are responsible for them, regret them, and intend to take all steps necessary to address them to enhance stability and functionality of the markets.” However, the statement also placed significant blame on the NYSE Arca system as the primary cause for the outage. The statement referred to systemic technological issues and called for collaboration among market leaders to progress the systems. The statement included references to policy changes and design improvements intended to mitigate the potential for further outages, specifically citing disaster recovery, as well as to improve communication with market participants when issues arise.

The Chief Executive of NASDAQ at the time, Robert Greifeld, said in an interview with The New York Times that they did not blame Arca and the NYSE for the shutdown, instead suggesting that a broader issue with technology in the market was to blame, as well as stating that the Nasdaq shared responsibility for the issues.

== New York Stock Exchange response ==
The NYSE refuted Nasdaq's claims that Arca was the primary cause of the outage. They took the position that Nasdaq was responsible for establishing and maintaining a system that could handle significant amounts of traffic and that a connectivity issue should not result in a closure of the entire exchange.

== Industry response ==
Various responses were issued by US regulators and financial services firms during and after the freeze. Then Chairman of the Securities and Exchange Commission (SEC), Mary Jo White issued a statement following the halt saying that the matter was serious and that it "should reinforce our collective commitment to addressing technological vulnerabilities of exchanges". She also stated that a meeting would be called between the leaders of the NYSE and Nasdaq exchange to encourage efforts to strengthen the markets. In the weeks following the freeze, the SEC called for both Nasdaq OMX and NYSE Euronext to develop timelines of the freeze in order to identify the causes and areas for improvement. It was reported that the two platforms had conflicting reports of the causes and events.

Nasdaq were also criticised for their lack of communication with traders and retail investors while the market was closed. Significantly, no message was sent by Nasdaq through the market feed to inform traders that the freeze had occurred. These messages are relied upon by automatic trading systems to ensure trades are not placed on markets which aren't operating, and resulted in manual shut down of trades in some firms. LandColt Capital Managing Director Todd Schoenberger was quoted as saying "The lack of transparency—we haven't heard from the Nasdaq, we haven't heard from Washington—it creates chaos and uncertainty.” Harvey Pitt, a former chair of the SEC was quoted as saying "It looked like Nasdaq was clueless about how to deal with this emergency." Media outlets reported that market participants were in communication with Nasdaq throughout the freeze, stating that there was an emphasis on ensuring the reopening of the market was without error, likely in an attempt to avoid a situation similar to the Facebook IPO. Many stakeholders believed that further issues at the reopening of the market would serve to damage investor confidence, and could lead to more substantial declines in the Nasdaq composite's value.

Some finance industry commentators and participants suggested that the lack of severe market downturns following the freeze suggested that investors were becoming more understandable of the technical issues associated with increasingly automated trading platforms. Ryan Detrick, a strategist with Schaeffer's Investment Research said of the matter: "The fact we didn’t see a larger dip on today’s mess shows most investors are, for better or worse, becoming more comfortable with these mistakes." However, other commentators highlighted the widespread uncertainty that technical glitches can contribute to. CEO of JonesTrading Group, William Jones was quoted as saying "This takes confidence from the markets," as well as suggesting that traders were unsure if they could trust quotes published on various stocks, quoting his traders as asking "Are these prints real, or are they not real?".

== Impact on financial markets ==
Unlike the flash crash of 2010, there were no significant losses in the market as a result of the trading halt. Media outlets suggested that the impact of the freeze was mitigated due to its timing, a Thursday afternoon in mid August, as well as by its relatively short time period. Michael Farr also credited the nature of the freeze, being caused by an error between exchanges, as assisting in preventing sell offs and negative impacts on other markets such as gold. A similar sentiment was expressed by Christopher Nagy, who is quoted by Fox News as saying "I think people realized it’s a technology issue rather than a major news event or something that would create panic and dysfunction." However, the freeze raised further questions about the increasing risks posed by tech advances in the finance industry, contributing to potential dips in market confidence. Particularly, a number of media outlets considered the potential for targeted cyber attacks on significant trading platforms. It was pointed out by many that increased frequency of technical glitches in financial markets would decrease trader confidence, which could lead to dramatic market sell offs. While this was not the case for the August 2013 flash freeze, other technical glitches such as in September 2013, and again October 2013 can create trends.

The structure of the industry was considered a contributing factor in the crash, given that miscommunication between NYSE and Nasdaq systems was the primary cause. Some journalists and financial commentators suggested that the freeze was evidence of the need for industry wide cooperation in developing emergency procedures to cope with the issues posed by high frequency trading. Democratic New York Senator Chuck Schumer was quoted as saying that the freeze was indicative of increasing computerisation of trading firms and exchange systems, calling for regulators to consider "fundamental market structure reforms." It was reported that the Commodity Futures Trading Commission (CFTC) intended to develop a plan to further regulate computer based trading in the wake of the flash freeze, also spurred by the Goldman Sachs Group glitch that occurred the week prior.

Brokerage firms that generate income through the execution of customer orders as well as proprietary trading firms were exposed to potential income loss during the freeze. Particularly given that many significant stocks such as Apple, Facebook, Google, and Amazon are listed on the Nasdaq, the shut down caused substantial interruptions to financial firms.

It was suggested by some media outlets that the decision of Twitter to hold their initial public offering (IPO) on the NYSE was partially a result of the flash freeze. The issues with the Facebook IPO were also credited as a cause for this decision.
