= ProShares =

Issuer of exchange-traded funds

- Industry: Financial services
- Founded: ProFunds Group: 1997; 29 years ago ProShares: 2006; 20 years ago
- Founders: Louis Mayberg; Michael Sapir
- Headquarters: Bethesda, Maryland
- Products: Exchange-traded funds
- AUM: US$70 billion (2024)
- Website: www.proshares.com//

ProShares is an American issuer of exchange-traded funds (ETFs), including leveraged ETFs, inverse ETFs, and similar products.

== History ==
ProFunds Group was founded in 1997 by former Rydex employees Louis Mayberg and Michael Sapir for $100,000. That year, it introduced bear market inverse mutual funds.

In 2006, ProFunds Group launched ProShares and its first leveraged and inverse ETF products.

In October 2021, the company launched an exchange-traded fund that invests in Bitcoin futures contracts.

On October 2, 2023, ProShares launched 3 Ethereum Futures ETFs in the US, becoming one of the first companies to launch an Ethereum ETF in US history.
