= Vinay Nair =

American academic

Vinay Nair is a serial entrepreneur and academic. He is involved as an advisor or board member in several companies in financial services, across investment management, venture capital and fintech. He is the founder and chairman of TIFIN, an AI platform to create and manage a portfolio of fintech brands and companies in areas of wealth management and asset management, as well as founder and chairman of 55ip, a fintech firm with offices in Boston and Mumbai, India that was acquired by J.P.Morgan.

Nair was a visiting professor at the MIT Sloan School of Management and at the Wharton School of the University of Pennsylvania where he taught Entrepreneurial Finance, Venture Capital and Private Equity. He is a recipient of the Colorado Governor’s Medal for Growth and Innovation, as well as on the board of the Center for Leadership at University of Colorado Boulder and Endeavor Colorado to support entrepreneurship in the region.

== Personal life ==
Vinay Nair grew up in India and completed his undergraduate studies at the Indian Institute of Technology, where he was awarded the Governor’s Gold Medal. He received his PhD in financial economics from New York University Stern School of Business with an award for best thesis. He currently lives in Boulder with his wife and three children.

== Career ==
Nair began his career as a faculty member at The Wharton School as an assistant professor of finance. He has also taught courses at INSEAD, Columbia University, Indian School of Business, and Pompeu Fabra University in Barcelona, Spain.

In 2008, Nair authored Investing for Change, published by Oxford University Press, on the use of social variables in investment management. He has spoken at financial conferences across the globe on topics including financial engineering, behavioral economics, and sustainable investing.

Nair founded Ada Investments in 2010. He was named a hedge fund rising star by Institutional Investor in 2012. FINalternatives noted that Ada Investments' investment approach grew from Nair's original academic investigations, and uses fundamental and behavioral insights to identify return drivers in equity markets. In 2014 XL Group acquired a minority stake in Ada Investments. Ada Investments was sold to 55 Capital Partners (renamed to 55ip), a firm he helped launch in June 2016. On December 2, 2020, JP Morgan Asset Management announced that it was acquiring 55ip. The deal value was not disclosed. Prior to founding Ada Investments, Nair was a research director and portfolio manager at Old Lane Partners, a fund acquired by Citi Alternative Investments.

In 2018, he formed TIFIN, a fintech holding company. TIFIN conceives, creates and operates fintech companies in the areas of wealth management, investments and personal finance. Its operating companies leverage the combined power of investment intelligence, data science, and technology to make investing a driver of financial wellbeing.

== See also ==
Vinay Nair on Google Scholar
