= Unit investment trust =

Investment product

In U.S. financial law, a unit investment trust (UIT) is an investment product offering a fixed (unmanaged) portfolio of securities having a definite life. Unlike open-end and closed-end investment companies, a UIT has no board of directors. A UIT is registered with the Securities and Exchange Commission under the Investment Company Act of 1940 and is classified as an investment company. UITs are assembled by a sponsor and sold through brokerage firms to investors.

== Types ==
A UIT portfolio may contain one of several different types of securities. The two main types are stock (equity) trusts and bond (fixed-income) trusts.

Unlike a mutual fund, a UIT is created for a specific length of time and is a fixed portfolio: its securities will not be sold or new ones bought except in certain limited situations (for instance, when a company is filing for bankruptcy or the sale is required because of a merger).

=== Stock trusts ===
Stock trusts are generally designed to provide capital appreciation and/or dividend income. They usually issue as many units (shares) as necessary for a set period of time before their primary offering period closes. Equity trusts have a set termination date, on which the trust liquidates and distributes its net asset value as proceeds to the unitholders. (The unitholders may then have special options for the reinvestment of this principal.)

=== Bond trusts ===
Bond trusts issue a set number of units, and when they are all sold to investors, the trust's primary offering period is closed. Bond trusts pay monthly income, often in relatively consistent amounts, until the first bond in the trust is called or matures. When this occurs, the funds from the redemption are distributed to the clients via a pro-rata return of principal. The trust then continues paying the new monthly income amount until the next bond is redeemed. That continues until all the bonds have been liquidated out of the trust. Bond trusts are generally appropriate for clients seeking current income and stability of principal.

== Legal status and documents ==
A UIT may be constituted as either a regulated investment company (RIC) or a grantor trust. A RIC is a trust, corporation or partnership in which investors have common investment and voting rights but do not have direct interest in investments of the investment company or fund. A grantor trust, in contrast, grants investors proportional ownership in the underlying securities.

A UIT is created by a document called the Trust Indenture. This document is drafted by the Sponsor of the fund, and names the Trustee and the Evaluator. By US law, the Sponsor and the Trustee may not be the same. The sponsor selects and assembles the securities to be included in the fund. The trustee keeps the securities, maintains unitholder records, and performs all accounting and tax reporting for the portfolio. The largest issuer of UITs is First Trust Portfolios. Other sponsors include Incapital, SmartTrust, Invesco, Millington Securities, Advisors Asset Management and Guggenheim Funds. Most large brokerage firms (such as Merrill Lynch and LPL Financial) sell UITs created by these sponsors.

== Tax perspective ==
From a tax perspective, UITs offer a shelter from the unrealized capital gains taxes typical inside of a mutual fund. Because individual UITs are assembled and purchased for specific periods of time, the cost basis consists of the initial purchase price of the securities held in the trust. A mutual fund, on the other hand, taxes the individual based on the entire previous tax year, regardless of the date purchased. An investor could, for example, purchase a mutual fund in October, absorb a loss during the last quarter of the year, and still be taxed on capital gains within the fund, depending on the overall performance of the underlying securities from January 1 of the current year. A UIT avoids such potential tax consequence by assembling an entirely new "investment" for each individual investor.

Some exchange-traded funds (ETFs) are technically classified as UITs: however, ETFs usually do not have set portfolios (they are either managed or update automatically to follow an index), and they can have lifetimes of over 100 years. For example, the SPDR S&P 500 Trust ETF is scheduled to terminate January 21, 2118.

== See also ==
- Brokerage firm
- Collective investment scheme
- Mutual fund
- Stockbroker
- Trust (law)
