= Exchange-traded fund =

Investment fund traded on stock exchanges

An exchange-traded fund (ETF) is a type of investment fund that is also an exchange-traded product; i.e., it is bought and sold on stock exchanges. ETFs own financial assets such as stocks, bonds, currencies, cryptocurrency, debt, and futures contracts, as well as commodities such as gold bars. ETFs provide more diversification than owning an individual stock and more market liquidity than owning an individual bond.

Most equity and fixed-income ETFs are index funds; they use passive management to replicate the performance of a stock market index or bond market index. These indices can be broad-based, such as the S&P 500 or Nasdaq-100 or focus on a certain industry such as the technology industry or the financial industry, a certain quality such as growth stocks or value stocks, a certain market capitalization, a certain factor such as high dividend stocks or value, momentum, quality, and low volatility, or a certain theme such as climate change, cloud computing, robotics, electric vehicles, the gig economy, e-commerce, or renewable energy. Other ETFs use active management, either by picking stocks or by the use of covered call strategies to generate income. For ETFs that invest in bonds, some will focus on government bonds, while others invest in corporate bonds or high-yield debt or focus on specific durations.

In the United States, actively managed ETF issuers are required by regulators to publish the composition of their portfolios on their websites daily, or monthly in the case of index ETFs, or quarterly in the case of active non-transparent ETFs. Unlike mutual funds, ETFs are priced continuously throughout the trading day.

ETF issuers charge annual expense ratios. Trading in ETFs may be subject to stockbroker commissions and financial transaction taxes. ETFs can be sold short, can be purchased using funds borrowed from a stockbroker (margin), and can be purchased and sold using limit orders, with the buyer or seller aware of the price per share in advance. Options, including put options and call options, can be written or purchased on many ETFs. ETF investors generally only realize capital gains taxes when they sell their own shares for a gain, making them more attractive tax-wise than mutual funds in some cases. ETFs have similarities to mutual funds, closed-end funds, and exchange-traded notes. ETFs are regulated by governmental bodies and are subject to securities laws.

== Statistics ==
The United States is by far the largest market for ETFs. In the United States, there is $10.2 trillion invested in equity ETFs, $2.4 trillion invested in fixed-income ETFs, and $0.6 trillion invested in other ETFs. In Europe, there is $1.4 trillion invested in equity ETFs, $0.7 trillion invested in fixed-income ETFs, and $0.1 trillion invested in other ETFs.

In Asia-Pacific, there is $1.9 trillion invested in equity ETFs and $0.2 trillion invested in fixed-income ETFs, including $837 billion in China, $712 billion in Japan, $242 billion in Taiwan, $212 billion in Australia, $206 billion in South Korea, $122 billion in India, and $75 billion in Hong Kong. Trading in ETFs accounts for approximately one-third of the total dollar volume of stock market trading in the US, 11% of trading volume in Europe, and 13% of trading volume in Asia. Purchases and sales of underlying assets by ETFs can significantly affect the price of such underlying assets.

In the United States, the largest ETF issuers by assets are BlackRock iShares with a 29.5% market share, The Vanguard Group with a 28.7% market share, State Street Global Advisors (SSGA) with a 13.4% market share, Invesco with a 5% market share, and Charles Schwab with a 4% market share.

== Legal structure ==
An ETF divides ownership of itself into shares that are held by shareholders. Depending on the country, the legal structure of an ETF can be a corporation, trust, open-end management investment company, or unit investment trust. Shareholders indirectly own the assets of the fund and are entitled to a share of the profits, such as interest or dividends, and would be entitled to any residual value if the fund undergoes liquidation. Shareholders also receive annual reports. An ETF generally operates with an arbitrage mechanism designed to keep it trading close to its net asset value, although deviations can occur.

ETFs that invest in commodities are generally structured as exchange-traded grantor trusts, which gives a direct interest in a fixed portfolio. SPDR Gold Shares, a gold ETF, is a grantor trust, and each share represents ownership of one-tenth of an ounce of gold.

== Investment structure ==
Most index ETFs invest 100% of their assets proportionately in the securities or assets that they intend to track, a manner of investing called replication. However, some ETFs instead use derivatives such as futures contracts, options, and swaps to track the underlying assets for all or a portion of their portfolios. This can lead to tracking error and may introduce counterparty risk. ETFs that engage in such practices include the Vanguard Total Stock Market Index Fund, the United States Oil Fund, some cryptocurrency ETFs, and synthetic ETFs.

Leveraged ETFs (LETFs) and inverse ETFs, use various financial engineering techniques, including equity swaps, derivatives, futures contracts, rebalancing, and re-indexing to seek a daily return that corresponds to a multiple of, or the inverse (opposite) of, the daily performance of an index with the result of significantly amplifying both risk and return. These funds must undergo daily rebalancing, selling after losses and buying after gains, and therefore are subject to volatility tax.

== Arbitrage mechanism ==
ETF shares are created and redeemed in large blocks called creation units. Authorized participants (APs), typically large financial institutions under contract with an ETF distributor, transact directly with the fund by exchanging a specified basket of securities, cash, or both for a fixed number of ETF shares. Retail investors instead trade ETF shares on an exchange. The creation units mirror the underlying securities held by the ETF. Creation occurs when an authorized participant delivers the ETF’s underlying securities to the fund and receives new ETF shares. Redemption occurs when the authorized participant returns ETF shares to the fund and receives the underlying securities. The AP's main incentive is profit through arbitrage: If the ETF trades above its underlying assets’ value, the AP creates new shares and sells them at the higher price. Conversely, if the ETF trades below its underlying assets' value, the AP buys ETF shares, redeems them for the more valuable underlying securities, and sells those. The spread between the price of an ETF and its underlying holdings occurs for multiple reasons including trading costs, and the time, risk, and fees involved in exchanging the securities.

The ability to purchase and redeem creation units gives ETFs an arbitrage mechanism intended to minimize the potential deviation between the market price and the net asset value of ETF shares. APs provide market liquidity for the ETF shares and help ensure that their intraday market price approximates the net asset value of the underlying assets. Other investors, such as individuals using a retail broker, trade ETF shares on the secondary market. When new shares of an ETF are created due to increased demand, this is referred to as ETF inflows. When ETF shares are converted into the component securities, this is referred to as ETF outflow. ETFs are dependent on the efficacy of the arbitrage mechanism in order for their share price to track net asset value.

== History ==
ETFs had their genesis in 1989 with Index Participation Shares (IPS), an S&P 500 proxy that traded on the American Stock Exchange (AMEX) and the Philadelphia Stock Exchange. This product was short-lived after a lawsuit by the Chicago Mercantile Exchange was successful in stopping sales in the United States. The argument against the IPS approach was that it resembled a futures contract because the investments held an index, rather than holding the actual underlying stocks. In 1990, a similar product, Toronto Index Participation Units, which tracked the TSE 35 and later the TSE 100 indices, started trading on the Toronto Stock Exchange (TSX) in 1990. The popularity of these products led the AMEX to try to develop something that would satisfy regulations by the U.S. Securities and Exchange Commission (SEC).

Nathan Most and Steven Bloom, under the direction of Ivers Riley, and with the assistance of Kathleen Moriarty, designed and developed Standard & Poor's Depositary Receipts (NYSE Arca: SPY), which were introduced in January 1993. Known as SPDRs or "Spiders", the fund became the largest ETF in the world. In May 1995, SSGA introduced the S&P 400 MidCap SPDRs (NYSE Arca: MDY). It is a frequent topic in the financial press that ETFs have a quick growth. These funds, with assets more than doubling each year since 1995 (as of 2001), have been embraced by most advocates of low-cost index funds. Vanguard is the leading advocate of index funds.

Barclays, in conjunction with MSCI and Funds Distributor Inc., entered the market in 1996 with World Equity Benchmark Shares (WEBS), which became iShares MSCI Index Fund Shares. WEBS originally tracked 17 MSCI country indices managed by the funds' index provider, Morgan Stanley. WEBS were particularly innovative because they gave casual investors easy access to foreign markets. While SPDRs were organized as unit investment trusts, WEBS were set up as a mutual fund, the first of their kind.

In 1998, SSGA introduced "Sector Spiders", separate ETFs for each of the sectors of the S&P 500. Also in 1998, the "Dow Diamonds" (NYSE Arca: DIA) were introduced, tracking the Dow Jones Industrial Average. In 1999, the influential "cubes" was launched, with the goal of replicating the price movement of the Nasdaq-100 – originally QQQQ but later Nasdaq: QQQ. The iShares line was launched in early 2000. By 2005, it had a 44% market share of ETF assets under management. Barclays Global Investors was sold to BlackRock in 2009.

In 2001, The Vanguard Group entered the market by launching the Vanguard Total Stock Market ETF (NYSE Arca: VTI), which owns every publicly traded stock in the United States. Some of Vanguard's ETFs are a share class of an existing mutual fund. iShares issued the first bond funds in July 2002: iShares IBoxx $ Invest Grade Corp Bond Fund (NYSE Arca: LQD), which owns corporate bonds, and a TIPS fund. In 2007, iShares introduced an ETF that owns high-yield debt and an ETF that owns municipal bonds, and SSGA and Vanguard also issued bond ETFs.

In December 2005, Rydex (now Invesco) launched the first currency ETF, the Euro Currency Trust (NYSE Arca: FXE), which tracked the value of the Euro. In 2007, Deutsche Bank's db x-trackers launched the EONIA Total Return Index ETF in Frankfurt tracking the Euro. In 2008, it launched the Sterling Money Market ETF (LSE: XGBP) and US Dollar Money Market ETF (LSE: XUSD) in London. In November 2009, ETF Securities launched the world's largest FX platform tracking the MSFX^{SM} Index covering 18 long or short USD ETC vs. single G10 currencies.

The first leveraged ETF was issued by ProShares in 2006. In 2008, the SEC authorized the creation of ETFs that use active management strategies. Bear Stearns launched the first actively managed ETF, the Current Yield ETF (NYSE Arca: YYY), which began trading on the AMEX on March 25, 2008.

In December 2014, assets under management by U.S. ETFs reached $2 trillion. By November 2019, assets under management by U.S. ETFs reached $4 trillion. Assets under management by U.S. ETFs grew to $5.5 trillion by January 2021. ProShares Bitcoin Strategy ETF, launched in October 2021, was the first ETF to track the price of Bitcoin; it invested in futures contracts. After legal cases that mandated approval by the SEC, the first ETFs to own spot bitcoin began trading in January 2024.

In October 2023, ProShares, VanEck and Bitwise Asset Management launched the first ETFs tied to the value of Ethereum; these ETFs invested in futures contracts. The first spot ETFs that own Ethereum began trading in May 2024; the SEC set the condition that the ETFs were not allowed to claim rewards on their coins from the proof-of-stake process, which eliminated a possible source of income.

=== Gold ETFs ===
The first gold exchange-traded product was Central Fund of Canada, a closed-end fund founded in 1961. It amended its articles of incorporation in 1983 to provide investors with a product for ownership of gold and silver bullion. It has been listed on the TSX since 1966 and the AMEX since 1986.

The idea of a gold ETF was first conceptualized by Benchmark Asset Management Company Private Ltd in India, which filed a proposal with the Securities and Exchange Board of India in May 2002. In March 2007 after delays in obtaining regulatory approval. The first gold exchange-traded fund was Gold Bullion Securities launched on the Australian Securities Exchange (ASX) in 2003, and the first silver ETF was iShares Silver Trust launched on the NYSE in 2006.

Unlike physical ownership of gold bullion, gold ETFs allow investors to gain exposure to the price of gold through shares traded on stock exchanges. Most gold ETFs either hold physical bullion in secure vaults or obtain exposure through derivatives, resulting in differences in tracking performance, costs, and investment objectives among products. SPDR Gold Shares, a commodity ETF, is the largest gold ETF and one of the largest ETFs by assets under management.

== Notable issuers ==
- Aberdeen Group: issues commodity ETFs
- AdvisorShares: issues actively managed ETFs only, majority owned by Fund.com
- Amundi: second ETF provider in Europe
- ARK Investment Management: issues actively managed ETFs that invest in companies involved in disruptive innovation
- BetaShares: issues ETFs in Australia
- BlackRock: issues iShares
- BNP Paribas: issues EasyETFs in Europe
- Boost ETP: issues short (inverse) and leveraged exchange-traded products including 3x equity and commodity products in Europe
- Charles Schwab Corporation: issues ETFs
- China Asset Management: issues ETFs primarily in China and Hong Kong
- China Southern Asset Management: issues ETFs primarily in China and Hong Kong
- Deutsche Bank: issues Xtrackers ETFs, and manages PowerShares DB commodity- and currency-based ETFs
- Dimensional Fund Advisors: factor-based ETFs
- ETF Securities: issues ETFs primarily in Australia
- Franklin Templeton Investments: Issues LibertyShares ETFs
- Global X Funds: issues ETFs
- Guggenheim Partners: issues specialty Guggenheim Funds ETFs
- Hang Seng Investment Management: issues ETFs in Hong Kong
- Indo Premier Investment Management: issues Premier ETFs in Indonesia Stock Exchange
- Invesco: issues ETFs, as well as BLDRS based on American depositary receipts
- Lyxor Asset Management: issues Lyxor ETFs in France
- ProShares: issues a variety of ETFs including leveraged and inverse ETFs for the NASDAQ and S&P 500, as well as a bitcoin futures ETF
- State Street Global Advisors: issues SPDRs
- The Vanguard Group: issues Vanguard ETFs, formerly known as VIPERs
- United States Commodity Funds: issues commodity ETFs such as the United States Oil Fund
- VanEck: issues ETFs; uses the Investo name in Brazil
- WisdomTree Investments: issues specialty ETFs

== See also ==
- Exchange-traded note (ETN)
- List of American exchange-traded funds
- List of exchange-traded funds
