= Assets under management =

Market value of financial assets

Assets under management (AUM), sometimes called fund under management (FUM), refers in finance to the total market value of all financial assets that a financial institution—such as a mutual fund, venture capital firm, or depository institution—or a decentralized network protocol manages and invests, typically on behalf of its clients. it is the basis for fee revenue and a key metric for gauging the size and success of investment entities.

Funds may be managed for clients, platform users, or solely for themselves, such as in the case of a financial institution which has mutual funds or holds its own venture capital. The definition and formula for calculating AUM may differ from one entity to another.

Assets under advisement (AUA) is a related measure. It is the total market value of the assets that a firm gives advice on but does not manage itself. It is mostly used by investment consultants and other intermediaries, who recommend how a client's money should be invested but cannot make the investment decisions. Because they have no power to manage these assets, advisers do not count them in their assets under management.

Assets under custody (AUC) is the total market value of client assets that a firm holds safely as a custodian. Assets under administration (AUA) is the total value of client assets that a firm handles as a fund administrator, for example by processing trades and keeping records. Custody and administration are often provided together.

== Overview ==
Assets under management is a popular metric used within the traditional investment industry as well as for decentralized finance, such as cryptocurrency, to measure the size and success of an investment management entity. AUM represents the market value of all of the securities that a financial entity owns and manages, or simply manages.

The AUM of an entity is often compared with historical data to express the amount (or lack) of growth. It is also often compared with the AUM of competitors, with an increase in AUM evidence of positive performance (growth). However, investment strategies may be capacity-constrained. This means that the strategy's investment performance is adversely affected if it manages too much capital. Namely, its performance is adversely affected if its AUM exceeds the strategy's capacity. As a result, these funds may be closed to new investors and oversubscribed. For such funds, AUM may not be an accurate metric of success. For example, the SPDR S&P 500 index fund manages nearly US$400 billion in assets. The index fund is not capacity-constrained and it is remains open to new investors. In contrast, As of 2021 Renaissance Technologies' Medallion Fund had outperformed the S&P 500 index. However, it managed fewer assets (reportedly about US$34.8 billion) than the SPDR S&P 500 index fund because it was oversubscribed and closed to new investors.

Methods of calculating AUM can vary between firms or decentralized protocols. Investment management companies generally charge their clients fees as a proportion of AUM, so assets under management, combined with the firm's average fee rate, are the key factors indicating an investment management company's top-line revenue. The fee structure may depend on contracted arrangements between each client and the firm or fund. Decentralized protocols also use a variety of ways to incentivize the growth of AUM, typically in the form of offering a return to those who serve the role of providing liquidity on the protocol.

Assets under management rise and fall. They may increase when investment performance is positive, or when new customers and new assets are brought into the firm. Rising AUM normally increases the fees which the firm generates. Conversely, AUM are reduced by negative investment performance as well as redemptions or withdrawals, including fund closures, client defections and other generally adverse events. Lower AUM tend to result in lower fees generated.

== Content ==
The precise definition of AUM varies by institution, as some firms may include certain assets as being "under management", while others may not. Some include bank deposits, mutual funds, and cash in their computation, while others only consider the discretionary funds that investors have given an advisor to trade on their behalf.

While different firms may include assets that others do not in their AUM computation, Assets Under Management typically include:

- Capital raised from investors;
- Capital belonging to the principals of the fund management firm.

For example, if fund managers contribute $2B of their capital to the fund and raise an additional $10B from investors, their AUM is $12B.

=== Net asset value vs. assets under management ===
Net asset value (NAV) is the total value of assets minus all its liabilities of a fund, such as a mutual fund or ETF, often shown on a per-share basis. NAV shows what price shares in a fund can be bought and sold at.

AUM by contrast refers to the value of assets managed by an individual or firm, not a fund. Unlike NAV, AUM is in reference to the total value of assets being managed rather than expressed on a per-share basis.

== Assets under advisement ==
A related concept in the investment industry to assets under management is assets under advisement (AUA). This measures the total market value of all the financial assets that are advised by a financial institution, which is typically an investment consultant or intermediary. The advisory firm generally does not have discretion to manage the assets, but rather provides advice as to how those assets may be managed. For example, consider an investment consultant that is hired by a US$100 billion pension fund to advise the fund on portfolio construction, asset allocation, fund manager selection, etc. The consultant would include the $100 billion in their firm's AUA. The consultant does not have discretion to manage the assets and thus would not include the assets in their firm's AUM.

== Assets under custody or administration ==
Institutional investors and asset managers rely on banks and non-bank financial institutions for processing domestic and cross-border trades, keeping financial assets safe and servicing the associated portfolios, a business referred to traditionally as custody and increasingly as asset servicing. These service providers and others also carry out a range of fund administration activities.

The measures Assets under Custody and Assets under Administration refer to a service provider's total market value of all the client assets held in the capacity of custodian and fund administrator respectively.

Data collected by globalcustody.net on 50+ service providers records dramatic growth in the overall size of this market in a generation. In 1999, three custodians had approximately US$6 trillion of client assets. By 2003, State Street surpassed US$10 trillion in assets under custody or administration. The latest figures have BNY not far short of US$50 trillion.

== See also ==
- List of asset management firms
- Custodian bank – Financial institution providing safekeeping and securities services
