= NYSE Arca =

American stock exchange

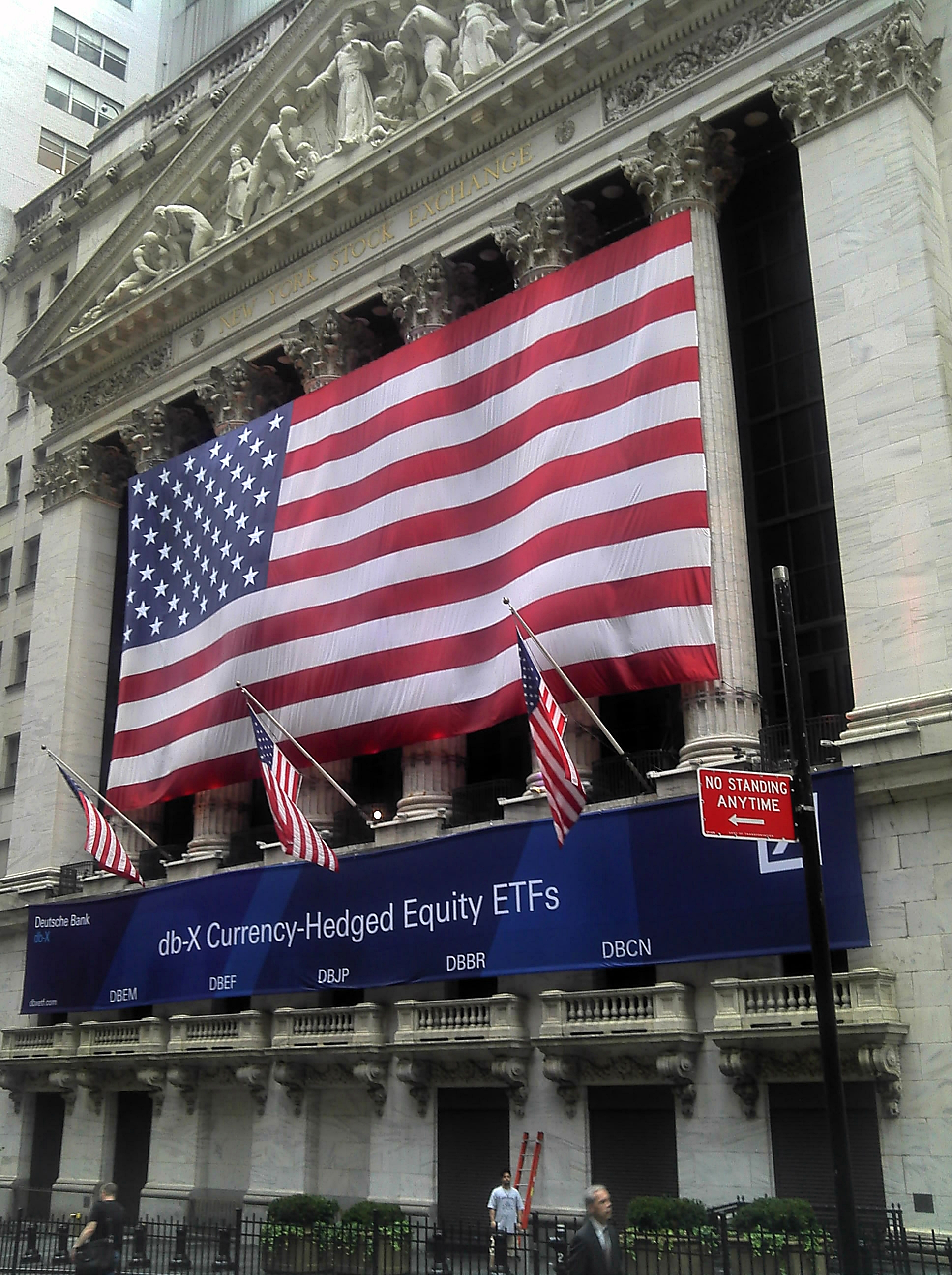
The New York Stock Exchange Building on August 9, 2011, when Deutsche Bank's db-X Group commenced trading on NYSE Arca

NYSE Arca, previously known as ArcaEx, an abbreviation of Archipelago Exchange, is an exchange on which both stocks and options are traded. It was owned by Intercontinental Exchange. It merged with the New York Stock Exchange (NYSE) in 2006 and now operates as a subsidiary of the NYSE Group, Inc. It is headquartered in Chicago.

== History ==
In November 1994, Stuart Townsend and Gerald Putnam founded TerraNova Trading LLC, an electronic securities exchange, in Chicago. Its product, Archipelago, started accepting trading orders on January 20, 1997.

In 2005, Archipelago Holdings, the owner of ArcaEx, bought the Pacific Exchange, after what had been a close working relationship since 2001.

In 2006, ArcaEx merged with the NYSE and the name was changed to NYSE Arca.

On August 22, 2013, the Arca system sent multiple sequences to Nasdaq which overloaded the Securities Information Processor (SIP) caused by reconnection issues to Nasdaq. This in turn caused a chain effect reaction which led to the NASDAQ flash freeze.

== See also ==
- List of stock exchanges
- List of stock exchanges in the Americas
- List of stock exchange mergers in the Americas
