= Specialized investment fund =

Tax policy in Luxembourg

A specialized investment fund (SIF) is a lightly regulated and tax-efficient regulatory regime in Luxembourg aimed at a broader range of eligible investors. This type of investment fund is governed by the Luxembourg law of 13 February 2007 replacing the law of 1991 defining the legal framework for institutional funds and enlarging the distribution scope to "well-informed investors". The SIF law significantly simplified the rules for setting up investment fund structures ranging from straightforward investment strategies investing in listed securities to hedge funds, real estate and private equity funds.

On 12 July 2013, the SIF regime was amended by the law on alternative investment fund managers (AIFM law). Consequently, the SIF law has been divided into two parts:

- General provisions applicable to all SIFs;
- Specific provisions applicable to SIFs which qualify as Alternative Investment Fund (AIF) and which require to be managed by an authorized Alternative Investment Fund Manager (AIFM).

Due to the broad definition of AIFs, most SIFs are qualified as SIF AIFs.

== Characteristics ==
=== Legal structures ===
The SIF may be structured as a:

- A common contractual fund (FCP- Fonds commun de placement) which has no legal personality and must therefore be managed by a management company;
- An investment company with variable capital (SICAV- société d'investissement à capital variable) or fixed capital (SICAF- société d'investissement à capital fixe) which can be self-managed or managed by an external management company.

A SICAV or SICAF can be set up using different legal forms. It can be set up as a public limited company (SA), a partnership limited by shares (SCA), a private limited liability company (SARL), a cooperative in the form of a public limited company (SCoSA), a limited partnership (SCS) or a special limited partnership (SCSp).

These different entities may create sub-funds each with a different investment policy. The rights of investors and of creditors concerning a sub-fund or which have arisen in connection with the creation, operation or liquidation of a sub-fund are limited to the assets of that sub-fund (i.e. Protected Cell Concept), unless a clause included in the constitutional documents provide otherwise.

=== Eligible investors ===
A fund created under the SIF law may be sold to "well-informed investors". According to the SIF law a well-informed investor is:

- An institutional investor;
- A professional investor;
- Any other investors who confirmed in writing that they are "well-informed investors" and either invest a minimum of €125,000 in the SIF or have an appraisal by a credit institution, an investment firm or a management company.

=== Diversification ===
The Luxembourg regulator (CSSF) issued a circular letter on the 3 August 2007 containing guidelines of the principle of risk spreading and investment restrictions for SIF vehicles:

- In principle, a SIF may not invest more than 30% of its assets or commitments in securities of the same type issued by the same issuer. However, this restriction does not apply to investments in securities issued or guaranteed by an OECD Member State or its local authorities, supranational institutions or organizations Furthermore, it is not applicable to target UCIs, which are subject to risk diversification principles that are at least comparable to those relevant to SIFs.
- Short sales may not, result in the SIF holding a short position in securities of the same type from the same issuer representing more than 30% of its assets.
- When using financial derivative instruments, the SIF must ensure through an appropriate diversification policy of the underlying assets a similar level of risk spreading. Similarly, the counterparty risk in an OTC transaction must, when applicable, be limited having regard to the quality and qualification of the counterparty.

=== Investment restrictions and leverage ===
The SIF regime offers a broad scope of eligible assets. There are no specified investment restrictions or leverage rules by the SIF Law. It is simply stated that a SIF should apply the principle of risk diversification. Therefore, assets may include equity bonds, derivatives, structured products, real estate and shareholdings in privately held companies.

The CSSF may provide exemptions from these restrictions on a case-by-case basis. However, the CSSF may also request that additional restrictions are adhered to, in cases of funds with specific investment policies.

=== Minimum fund size and dividends ===
The SIF law sets a minimum fund size of €1.25 million which must be reached within 12 months after inception.

Issued shares of a SICAV must be fully subscribed, but only 5% of the amount of the subscription must be paid up in cash or by other means of contribution.

There are no specific restrictions on the payment of dividends. Nevertheless, such payments may not result in the size of the SIF falling below the minimum level of €1.25 million.

=== Valuation of the assets ===
Unless otherwise provided for in the issuing document, the valuation of the assets must be based on fair value, determined in accordance with the procedures laid down in the management regulations (FCP) or articles of incorporation (SICAV-SICAF).

=== Duties and taxes ===
The CSSF filing duty is fixed at €2650 for a single compartment SIF and €5000 for a multiple compartment SIF. The CSSF annual fee is fixed at €2650 for a single compartment SIF and €5000 for a multiple compartment SIF.

An annual subscription tax of 0,01% on the net asset value (NAV) has to be paid to the Luxembourg government ('taxe d'abonnement').

== Appointing a SIF-AIF ==
A SIF that is qualified as an alternative investment fund according to the AIFM law must be managed by an authorized alternative investment fund manager (AIFM) which may either be established in Luxembourg, in a Member State of the EU, or in a third country.

Following the AIFM Law, a SIF-AIF can be managed in two different ways:

- it can be managed externally through the calling of a separate AIFM responsible for managing the SIF AIF. In this case it is the governing body of the SIF AIF which is empowered to call an authorized AIFM;
- it can be managed internally. In this case the SIF AIF will be considered as the AIFM itself and it will be required to comply with all of the AIFM Law obligations which apply to an AIFM and submit a request for authorization under the AIFM Law.

=== Depositary Functions ===
Depositaries of SIF AIFs must comply with the new depositary regime as provided for by the AIFM Law.

This new depositary regime imposes specific duties, being the following:

- the obligation to protect the SIF AIFs assets;
- the obligation to monitor the SIF AIFs cash flow;
- as well as specific oversight duties.

In addition, the liability regime has been reviewed and strengthened by the AIFM Law. The depositary is strictly liable in the case of a loss of financial instruments it held in custody and it must, without delay, return financial instruments of an identical type or of corresponding amount to the SIF AIF or the AIFM acting for the SIF AIF. Avoiding the consequences of this liability regime is very limited.

Any other losses caused by the depositary's negligent or intentional failure to properly fulfill its obligation under the AIFM Law fall under the depositary's liability.

=== Valuation Function ===
The valuation function (valuation of assets and calculation of NAV) has to be performed either by the AIFM itself or by an external company that will act under the responsibility of the AIFM and that is subject to a mandatory professional registration recognized by law. The NAV (net asset value) must be calculated at least once a year.

=== Content of annual Report ===
SIF AIFs have to disclose additional information in their annual reports compared to SIFs, being:

- the total amount of remuneration it paid to its staff for the financial year;
- the number of beneficiaries;
- any carried interest paid by the SIF AIF.
- the aggregate amount of remuneration, as broken down by senior management and by AIFM staff members whose actions have a material impact on the risk profile of the SIF AIF.

=== Risk Management ===
A SIF qualifying as an AIF must establish a risk management function separated hierarchically from that of the operating units. An adequate risk management system must be implemented in order to identify, measure, manage and monitor appropriately all investment risks arisen through the SIF AIF investment strategy.

== Marketing ==
The exercisable marketing rules vary depending on whether the SIF is a SIF AIF:

=== SIF AIFs ===
Only SIF AIFs managed by an EU authorized AIFM benefit from a passport allowing the AIFM to market the SIFs within the EU.

The marketing of SIF AIFs outside or within Europe to well-informed investors, which do not qualify as professional investors, requires compliance with the NPR (national private placement rules) of each country where such marketing is done.

=== Other SIFs ===
SIFs that do not fall under the AIFM Law do not benefit from an EU passport for the marketing of their shares or units and therefore remain subject to the NPR of each country where the SIF is intended to be marketed.

== Notes ==
- "SIF - Synonym for Flexibility"Information Platform for SICAV-SIFs;
- "Key advantages of a SIF" -Luxembourg Fund Partners
- "How to set up a Specialised Investment Fund", Luxembourgforfinance;
- "Specialized investment fund" - ALFI
- "Specialized Investment Fund Memo" Elvinger, Hoss & Prussen.
