= Umbrella fund =

An umbrella fund is a collective investment scheme that exists as a single legal entity but has several distinct sub-funds which, in effect, are traded as individual investment funds. In UK law, the concept is defined in Section 756B of the Finance Act 2004 and is central to the structuring, taxation and regulation of small funds, especially the ones under the Appointed Representative regime.

This type of arrangement originated in the European investment management industry, most notably with the SICAV (an open-ended collective investment). The SICAV model was copied for the UK open-ended investment company (OEIC) and offshore fund models.

== Advantages ==
The umbrella fund structure makes it cheaper for investors to move from one sub-fund to another and saves the investment manager costs relating to regulatory duplication. Small fund managers can also benefit from the umbrella structure by splitting the regulatory costs under a single shared umbrella that holds multiple managers.

An umbrella fund can also be set up to provide retirement, death and other benefits to members of a participating employer. In such a fund there are several participating employers who enjoy more or less the same benefits and the fund is managed by professional trustees. They cut the cost by saving on maintenance and management fees and sometimes take advantage of reduced tax rates.

== See also ==
- Collective investment schemes
- Investment management
- Mutual funds
- OEIC
- SICAV

Other umbrella terms

- Umbrella brand
- Umbrella organization
- Umbrella term
