= Tax transparent fund =

A tax transparent fund (TTF) - also known as an authorised contractual scheme fund - is the proposed authorised collective investment scheme structure in the United Kingdom once the UK Finance Bill 2012 becomes an act and when the Financial Services and Markets Act 2000 and the Corporation Tax Act 2010 are amended, sometime mid-2012. TTFs will then have the option to be based in the UK rather than in competing European domiciles. Both Luxembourg and Ireland have already introduced such structures, formally known as the Fond commun de placement (FCP) and the Common contractual fund (CCF).

== History ==
- In 2010 a lobby formed for a U.K. transparent fund to be developed ahead of the implementation of the Undertakings for Collective Investment in Transferable Securities Directives (UCITS) IV directive in July 2011. It was felt that a transparent fund would be a beneficial vehicle to complement the existing range of UK funds. Feeder fund investors under a master/feeder structure would benefit from tax treaty agreements, whilst fund managers could access greater economies of scale when all the assets are pooled in a tax efficient manner.
- In the UK Government's budget of March 2011, an announcement heralded a positive step forward in bringing a TTF to the industry by the summer of 2012.
- In May 2011 an indication was given that regulation rather than legislation was required, and it would allow for more time to consult on the issues.
- From May – December 2011 there was an informal consultation process with industry, advisers, HM Treasury, HMRC and Financial Services Authority convening working groups, with experts from a commercial, product, legal and tax perspective.
- In December 2011 an initial draft of the Finance Bill 2012 confirmed that regulators will be granted powers to exempt qualifying funds from stamp duty and stamp duty reserve tax. Subsequently, the Corporation Tax Act 2010 requires amendment to ensure that the new TTF funds are not accountable to pay for corporation tax. Overall this requires an amendment to the Financial Services and Markets Act 2000 to ensure all boundaries are set and any legalities are pre-determined before TTF's are launched.
- In January 2012 a consultation document was published. The government aims to have the new/amended legislation and the TTF vehicle to come into effect by the summer of 2011.

== The benefits ==
- If the UK does not offer a tax transparent fund to investors and fund managers it could potentially mean billions of assets going offshore. The Investment Manager Association reviewed how this would affect the UK and included it in their budget representation to the treasury. Due to Ireland and Luxemburg already being in this space there was a concern the UK would be left behind, especially as a number of other countries are looking at introducing this type of vehicle.
- Research conducted by Northern Trust has illustrated the potential savings obtained by avoiding the drag on WHT, comparing a traditional Collective Investment Vehicle such as an Irish Investment Company with Variable Capital (ICVC) vs a CCF. Investors, who are in a traditional Irish ICVC and invest in the US equity markets that should be exempt from paying tax, suffer a 30% WHT on U.S. dividend income. The following graph illustrates the cumulative difference of a CCF less an ICVC, thus highlighting the positive impact a TTF would bring to the UK verses opaque fund structures.

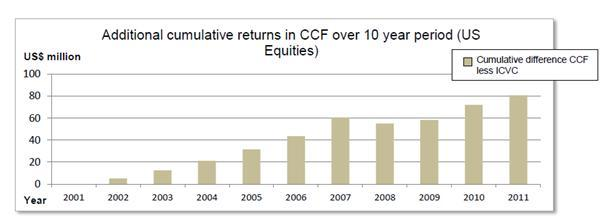
Source: The Northern Trust Company - January 20th 2012

- A UCITS IV master feeder needs to be tax-transparent. The UK TTF will permit feeder funds in different domiciles to invest in the same master vehicle allowing the feeder fund to maintain the correct WHT position. Therefore, funds from across Europe can be moved into a centrally managed pooling model to benefit from a consistent management strategy and operating cost efficiencies whilst still benefitting from tax advantages.
- Life companies will be able to mitigate the effects of the Solvency II Directive (capital requirements) by having unit holders rather than policyholders.
- Multinational Pension Pooling, governance, oversight, risk control and cost efficiencies - Grouping pension funds and other assets into a cross-border pooling fund allows for significant cost efficiencies in various areas such as investment management, administration, custody, audit and service fees. Tax neutrality is the aim here.
