= Fund governance =

Financial checks and balances system

Fund governance refers to a system of checks and balances and work performed by the governing body (board) of an investment fund to ensure that the fund is operated not only in accordance with law, but also in the best interests of the fund and its investors. The objective of fund governance is to uphold the regulatory principles commonly known as the four pillars of investor protection that are typically promulgated through the investment fund regulation applicable in the jurisdiction of the fund.

These principles vary by jurisdiction and in the US, the 1940 Act generally ensure that: (i) The investment fund will be managed in accordance with the fund's investment objectives, (ii) The assets of the investment fund will be kept safe, (iii) When investors redeem they will get their pro rata share of the investment fund's assets, (iv) The investment fund will be managed for the benefit of the fund's shareholders and not its service providers.

== Fund governance structures ==
=== Offshore investment funds ===
Offshore investment funds are typically formed as companies in the Cayman Islands (85%). When an investment fund is formed as a company, its governing body is its board of directors. In this context, fund governance is commonly referred to as "fund directorships" or "independent director services". Offshore funds are commonly structured as "feeder" funds that will generally invest all monies received directly into a "master" fund.

=== Onshore investment funds ===
Onshore investment fund are typically formed as limited partnerships (LPs) in the United States, most commonly in Delaware. These funds typically serve as the "master" fund to the offshore feeder fund. The governing body (board) of the LP is its general partner (GP) which is usually under the sole control and direction of the investment manager or fund sponsor. This structure is increasingly being challenged by institutional investors and other stakeholders to implement more independent governance and investor friendly mechanisms typically in the form of advisory boards or independent GPs or managing members.

=== Unit trusts ===
Investment funds can also be formed as unit trusts with a board of trustees as its governing body.

== Role of governance ==
The role of fund governance comprises both fiduciary duties and responsibilities owed by the governing body (board). Fiduciary duties are prescribed by the applicable laws of the fund's jurisdiction and are inviolable. Responsibilities are prescribed through contractual terms in the various fund documents. Fund governance responsibilities can vary widely between investment funds because fund documents are commonly negotiated between fund stakeholders based on their various (often competing) requirements and objectives. Although the objective of fund governance is investor protection, fiduciary duties typically require the board to act in the best interest of a fund taken as whole and not any particular investor.

== Key differences between fund governance and corporate governance ==
Fund governance is often conflated with corporate governance. Although some principles and practices appear similar, there are important differences. Most notably:

=== Legal structure ===
Not all funds are formed as corporations and the legal form of the fund structure does not remove the need for sound fund governance.

=== Employees ===
Unlike corporations, investment funds typically don't have any employees to manage or lead. Corporate directors have more authority and a more complex set of duties to execute, such as approving major corporate investment and financial policies, monitoring diverse accounting systems, and selecting and terminating top corporate executives. Compared to hedge funds, the regulatory and competitive issues facing each company are highly idiosyncratic. Investment funds operate by appointing service providers under service agreements with the fund and each service provider is governed by its own governing body independently of the fund. This means that fund directors do not have any authority to direct the affairs of the service providers to the fund other than under the contractual responsibilities outlined in the service agreement. Day-to-day managerial responsibilities are typically delegated to the investment manager and fund administrator. Compared to large corporations, hedge funds are relatively homogenous, and the duties of their directors are relatively limited and standardized. These factors should reduce the required time investment and increase the scalability of the director's human capital such that it can be employed efficiently across many funds.

=== Investors ===
Corporations offer their shares publicly and widely typically with no qualification requirements. Funds offer their shares privately on a restricted basis to sophisticated investors.

=== Strategy ===
Corporations don't have a rulebook (like an offering memorandum) or delegated structure so corporate directors are responsible for formulating and implementing strategy to ensure the success of the corporation. Corporate directors have a dual role of adviser and monitor, but this is not the case in a fund. Fund directors typically serve as a monitor since the fund is usually formed to pursue the investment objective defined by the investment manager as negotiated and agreed in the fund documents by its various stakeholders. Fund directors will typically not have any responsibility for the investment strategy as the investment manager is not an employee of the fund unlike the CEO in a corporation. Thus, "the advisory role of hedge fund directors is limited when compared to that of corporate directors. For example, hedge fund directors do not advise the manager on portfolio strategy or security selection".

== Growth of the professional fund governance firm ==
Fund governance became a major fund servicing industry following the 2008 financial crisis "spurred (by) several media reports arguing that professional directors must be too busy to provide the appropriate level of monitoring for their clients." Consequently, many fund governance firms proliferated in response to perceived demand for independent directors for hedge funds and the low barriers to entry evident in the industry. A 'gold rush' mentality developed worldwide after articles by the Financial Times and the New York Times sensationalized fund directors in the Cayman Islands as having 'hundreds' of directorships. Serving as a fund director was portrayed as a sinecure because anyone, anywhere in the world, could serve as a director on a Cayman Islands mutual fund (the FT articles were later critiqued by the Columbia Journalism Review). In response to this critical media scrutiny, the Cayman Islands Monetary Authority implemented a number of reforms under the Director Registration and Licensing Law, 2014 which required all directors of Cayman Islands regulated mutual funds to become regulated. As of 31 May 2015, the Cayman Islands Monetary Authority reported that there were 8,879 directors on Cayman Islands funds of which only 422 were based in the Cayman Islands.

== Professional firms vs. proprietors ==
Fund governance providers range from limited-resourced, proprietorships of part-time directors (or so-called 'boutique' firms) to fully resourced professional services firms of full-time directors, "organized similarly to large law or accounting firms". In many parts of the world, serving as a fund director remains a cottage industry where proponents argue that fund governance is different from the other services provided to the fund and not adaptable to the professional firm approach. This mindset appears to be supported by the law in several jurisdictions that mandate that only "natural persons" provide director services. Opponents of the proprietor approach argue that boards should not be "dominated by part-timers at a time when they need to be vigilant about avoiding future crises" and that professional funds "would never buy legal services or management advice from people only willing to spare a few hours a month".

Professional fund governance firms are also referred to as Board Service Providers (BSPs). Proponents argue that directors are independent service providers to a fund equivalent to its auditors, administrators and attorneys, all of whom use a professional firm approach and the same professional standards and expectations should also apply to fund governance. In the U.K. all professional investment funds are required by law to appoint a BSP as an Authorised Corporate Director. In the United States of America, BSPs are not required by law, but the SEC does "require funds to explicitly authorize the independent directors to hire employees and to retain advisers and experts necessary to carry out their duties".

Post-financial crisis and several spectacular fund governance failures, there has been much debate among fund directors worldwide about whether the proprietorship or professional firm approach is best for a professional fund. The matter has also been studied extensively by leading independent academic researchers at the Stanford Law Review, University of Kentucky and University of Cambridge among many others. Collectively these independent studies shattered many of the myths about professional fund governance and consistently supported the professional firm model over the proprietor model. Currently there is no independent research that supports the proprietorship model. In the Stanford Law Review, the authors argue "we know of no other service provided for corporations that is obligated by law to be performed by a sole proprietorship, and for good reason. Lawyers, consultants, accountants, doctors, and so on, all associate with each other to form corporate entities to provide their services for a host of well understood reasons".

Empirical and anecdotal evidence from other fund services providers such as legal, administration and audit also supports the professional firm approach and it continues to dominate the professional fund industry. As such professional fund governance firms have the "economies of scale to attract the best board members, introduce more rigorous training programs and develop the best proprietary knowledge" plus economies of scale and scope allow firms to increase quality and/or lower cost by finding efficiencies in production, spreading fixed costs across a larger asset base and investing in technology. Independent researchers further argue that BSPs bring "collective expertise, from the ability to process huge quantities of information to specialist advice" use the power of technology for business intelligence, process management and information access to make fast and accurate decisions.

== Notable fund governance scandals and failures ==
=== Bear Stearns ===
The Bear Stearns case is widely regarded as the seminal case of legal counsel conflicts among hedge fund directors. Investors in the funds lost approximately $1.6 billion and "the two supposedly independent directors appointed by Walkers to serve Cioffi's two hedge funds were Scott Lennon and Michelle Wilson-Clarke" were found by the Cayman Islands court to be conflicted as they were employees of an affiliate of Walkers. In his judgment the Chief Justice of the Cayman Islands said "For reasons which I need not elaborate now (but would be prepared to if asked), I am led to an irresistible impression that the manner of the conduct of the directors, trustee and the lawyers advising them" — all Walkers employees — "over the resolutions for winding up was clandestine and suspicious and was certainly in breach of the strict prohibition — against such a resolution being taken during the pendancy of the investors' petition for the removal of the directors."

=== Sark Lark ===
During the 1980s, Sark was notorious for the emergence of the so-called "nominee director" practice i.e. where the director is in name only and does not exercise his judgment independently but rather acts like an automaton under the control of another person. The most infamous example was in 1999, when Guinness world record holder and Sark resident Phil Crowshaw was found to have singlehandedly held 3,378 directorships registered in Sark, 1,312 registered directorships in England and more than 2,000 directorships registered in Dublin and Isle of Man. He was later disqualified as a director by courts in Guernsey and the U.K. yet he was only one of "a group of residents who between them held directorships of thousands of companies scattered far and wide". These individuals were engaged in "the totally unacceptable practice of renting out their names as company directors without any real knowledge of what the companies are up to." In response Jack Straw, the Home Secretary commissioned Andrew Edwards, former UK Treasury director to investigate these practices among Britain's offshore dependencies. In 1998, the Edwards report called for various reforms including that "Guernsey, Alderney and Sark should introduce a system of licensing and registering directors and bring in a code of conduct governing the standards expected from directors and trustees." The Edwards report "also called for a limit to be set on the number of directorships held by individuals, suggesting a ceiling of five trading companies or 30 asset-holding (fund) companies". The Sark Lark ignited the debate about director capacity and the backlash against independent directors in offshore jurisdictions. It was the genesis of the now discredited notion that caps on directorships would improve director performance or the number of directorships held is a proxy for director performance. Several jurisdictions arbitrarily introduced caps on director capacity based on the Edwards report. However, as recently as November, 2012, BBC reported that the Sark Lark was still thriving.

=== Weavering Capital ===
The Weavering case was widely regarded as the seminal case on hedge fund directors' duties and responsibilities. The Weavering Macro Fixed Income Fund Limited was listed on the Irish Stock Exchange and its directors Stefan Peterson and Hans Ekstrom were considered independent and in good standing under the Irish Stock Exchange standards. However, they were later found guilty by a Cayman Islands Court of being negligent in carrying out their fiduciary duties, and were held liable for US$111 million in damages. The case was reversed on appeal and currently pending appeal to the Privy Council. The Weavering Capital Scandal became notorious because the Managing Director of the UK Management Company, Magnus Peterson, was jailed for 13 years on 8 counts of Fraud in 2015 and the discovery that he had illegally used investors money to fund personal projects such as the Grey Wolf (Film).

== Fund governance standards ==
=== Reputational capital ===
Successful fund governance firms have been criticized by their competitors in 'boutique' firms for having too many directorships or being "rubber stamp" directors. However, independent empirical research has consistently revealed these allegations as counterfactual. Some studies have used the number of directorships held by a director as a proxy for the reputational capital of the director - arguing that reputational incentives are particularly pronounced for professional hedge fund directors, and that directors who sit on more boards and the boards of better performing funds should be of higher quality. Thus, hiring a director who can be credibly perceived as being more independent could provide valuable certification for the fund. Busy professional directors are more common among funds that derive higher benefits from external certification and monitoring, and their departure from the board is associated with outflows of investor capital. This result is inconsistent with directors serving as uninformative (or most nefariously, pro-management) rubber-stamps and inconsistent with the theory that funds prefer rubber-stamp directors who face more time constraints, making them too busy to monitor the manager.

=== Voting shares ===
An inordinate amount of scrutiny has been placed on issue of board capacity and composition to improve board performance, but those factors may become irrelevant to boards acting in the best interests of investors if the voting shares are held by the manager. If a serious conflict arises with the manager the degree to which the board can effectively act in the best interests of the fund can be neutralized in these circumstances. The voting shares give the manager complete discretion over the appointment and removal of directors; therefore controlling board composition and the ability to veto any of its decisions. If the investment manager is dissatisfied with any decision, he can simply exercise his right to remove the director(s) and replace them with someone more amendable to the manager's wishes.

=== Composition ===
The board requires has the right mix of skills, talent and capacity to function effectively. Proprietors and boutique firms by definition have limited resources and – by design – do not invest the time or money required to deliver the full range of resources provided by professional firms. As the large fund governance firms become more dominant, it has become common for proprietors and other boutique firms to band together, pooling their resources to create a larger 'virtual' or 'pseudo' professional firm to offer greater scale and selection to compete with the large professional firms. These alliances are commonly marketed as 'split' or 'mixed' boards. However, these loose arrangements often lack the operating discipline and reputational investment of their large professional firm counterparts. In fact, the arrangements create co-dependency for business referrals and actually create higher complexity and potential for conflicts of interests since and they are entered into primarily for commercial reasons, and not to act in the best interests of the fund. It is not uncommon for these arrangements to result in a high level of duplication and dysfunction.

=== Split or mixed boards ===
All directors owe the same fiduciary duties and directors each have joint and several liability so in reality 'split' or 'mixed' boards is a marketing aphorism and distinction without a difference. Independent research has found that professional firms of quality directors have large reputational investment with high incentive to perform well and consistently outperform proprietorships. This research found that "directors from a top ten firm are almost twice as likely as directors from smaller firms to obtain a new directorship." This implies that directors are even more likely to be hired when their firm has a larger client base, and thus more reputational capital to protect. The single firm focus is counterfactual to the risk analysis. Unquestionably the area of greatest risk within any fund is within its investment portfolio. Enormous authority over the fund affairs is often entrusted to the investment manager as a single individual, from a single firm, yet it would be universally accepted to be counterproductive and inefficient to appoint another manager from a different firm to manage the same portfolio at the same time, or another auditor from different firm to audit the same fund at the same time. It is not obvious, other than the aforementioned marketing reason, why any one believes that appointing directors from different firms is an effective mechanism for eliciting independent judgment and deliberation than those doing the deciding work for a (single) firm instead.

=== Lead director ===
Boards are small organizations but like all organizations they need effective leadership to succeed. The SEC recommends fund boards to appoint a lead director and it has become an industry leading practice for many fund boards to appoint a lead director to enhance the efficiency and effectiveness of the board. The lead director may schedule, set and prioritize board meeting agendas and make sure the board receives reports from management on essential matters. The lead director may also be the chief contact for the board's counsel or the fund's auditors (or other service providers). If the lead director is an independent director, he or she may represent the other independent directors in discussions with the fund management. SEC also recommends directors employ staff.

== See also ==
- Fund administration
- Investment management
- Hedge fund
