= Independent financial adviser =

Professional who offers financial advice under specific regulatory laws

An independent financial adviser (IFA) is a professional who offers independent advice on financial matters to their clients and recommends suitable financial products from the whole of the market. The term was developed to reflect a United Kingdom (UK) regulatory position and has a specific UK meaning, although it has been adopted in other parts of the world, such as Hong Kong and Australia, where financial advisers are regulated under the Australian financial services licence (AFSL) regime.

The term "independent financial adviser" was coined to describe the advisers working independently for their clients rather than representing an insurance company, bank or bancassurer. At the time (1988) the UK government was introducing the polarisation regime which forced advisers to either be tied to a single insurer or product provider or to be an independent practitioner. The term is commonly used in the United Kingdom where IFAs are regulated by the Financial Conduct Authority (FCA) and must meet strict qualification and competence requirements.

Typically an independent financial adviser will conduct a detailed survey of a client’s financial position, preferences and objectives; this is sometimes known as a factfind. The adviser will then recommend appropriate action to meet the client's objectives; and if necessary recommend a suitable financial product to match the client’s needs.

Individuals and businesses consult IFAs on many matters including investment, retirement planning, insurance, protection and mortgages (or other loans). IFAs also advise on some tax and legal matters.

== New rules for financial advisers in the UK from 2013 ==
From the end of 2012, there will be two types of financial advisor: independent or restricted. IFAs will no longer be allowed to receive commissions from financial services companies on new sales of investments. Instead, they will have to set their own fees, based on the services they offer, and agree with the client on fees before providing any services. Any advice that does not meet this standard must be labelled as restricted. IFAs should also be able to demonstrate to the FCA that they review all the suitable products in a market and that they give fair, unbiased and unrestricted advice. These changes are intended to make their charges more transparent and advice more genuinely independent.

However, some banks, building societies and insurance advisers could switch to offering an ‘information only’ (non-advised) service instead, where fees won’t be apparent. Advisers will also be allowed to keep earning it on products they have sold before the end of 2012, and still charge a regular fee if they are providing an ongoing service such as reviewing and advising on a client's investments. Neither do these new rules apply to the sale of cash savings products, general insurance, protection products (term life insurance, critical illness cover, income protection insurance etc.) or mortgages unless they are sold at the same time as a regulated investment product.

== Qualifications for IFAs in the UK ==
To offer financial advice an individual must represent or be an appointed representative of a firm registered with the Financial Conduct Authority (FCA). The FCA require that firms ensure that individuals acting for them have appropriate qualifications. The list of appropriate qualifications is determined by the Financial Services Skills Council at the behest of the FCA.

Up to the end of 2012 all financial advisers only required a qualification at Level 3 or above of the Qualifications and Credit Framework. From the end of 2012, financial advisers will need to be qualified at Level 4 or above. (This is about the same as completing the first year of a university degree.) An increasing number of advisers are now also “Chartered”, which means being qualified to a level 6 standard (equivalent to a first class honours degree.)

From the end of 2012, financial advisers will need to obtain an annual Statement of Professional Standing. This statement confirms that the adviser is suitably qualified, that the adviser subscribes to a code of ethics and that the adviser has kept his or her knowledge up-to-date through continuing professional development.

Most financial qualifications are assessed under the Qualifications and Credit Framework (QCF). You will see that these have a QCF grade, from level 1 to level 8.

=== IFA Network ===
IFA Network is an association of IFAs. All financial advisers in the UK must either be authorised or exempt under the Financial Services and Markets Act 2000. Membership of an IFA Network qualifies an IFA as being exempt from regulation. The IFA Network is then responsible for the advice and regulatory compliance of its members.

Source: Financial Conduct Authority What is an appointed representative? An appointed representative is a firm that conducts regulated business on behalf of a directly FCA-authorised firm, who is its ‘principal’. The principal firm takes regulatory responsibility for the appointed representative, and must ensure it meets FCA requirements.

=== Australia ===
In Australia, financial advisers are regulated under the Australian financial services licensing framework. The use of terms such as “independent”, “impartial” and “unbiased” in relation to financial advice is restricted under Australian financial services law.

An adviser or financial services licensee generally cannot describe their advice as independent where they receive certain commissions, volume-based payments or other benefits from product issuers, or where their business relationships or ownership structure may influence the advice provided.

The distinction is intended to help consumers differentiate between advisers whose remuneration and business structure are independent of financial product providers and advisers operating under arrangements that may involve commissions or institutional relationships.

Independent financial advice remains a relatively small segment of the Australian financial advice market, particularly because the legislative test for using the term is narrower than the ordinary consumer understanding of independence.

== See also ==
- Financial advice
- Financial adviser
- Financial planner
- Pensions in the United Kingdom
- Self-invested personal pension
- Collective investment scheme
