= Responsible entity =

A responsible entity is a peculiarly Australian invention designed to replace the manager/trustee in managed investment schemes. It was created by the Managed Investments Act 1998, which made significant amendments to the prescribed interest provisions contained in the Australian Corporations Act.

== Overview ==
The new arrangements replaced the relatively well known formula used in most common law jurisdictions of a two-tiered trustee/management company regime with a single responsible entity. The responsible entity holds scheme property on trust for scheme members. The responsible entity has power to appoint an agent to do anything that it is authorised to do in connection with a scheme. This may include the appointment of a custodian to hold scheme property on behalf of the responsible entity.

Since November 1999 the Australian takeover scheme regulations were extended to listed schemes and the takeovers provisions and compulsory acquisitions provisions apply.

== Ownership ==
The Responsible Entity must be an Australian public company, with certain levels of net tangible assets, depending on the value of the scheme’s assets. The Responsible Entity must hold an Australian Financial Services Licence.

When acting on behalf of an investment scheme, the Responsible entity must:

- Act honestly
- Exercise a reasonable degree of care and diligence
- Act in the best interest of members of the investment scheme
- Treat all investment scheme members equally

A Responsible Entity can either be owned by the same group as the fund manager, i.e. an "internal" responsible entity, or alternatively be run separate to the fund manager, i.e. an "external" responsible entity. Where the Responsible Entity is external, the Responsible Entity, on behalf of the investment scheme, typically enters into a management agreement with the fund manager. There are a number of external Responsible Entities that fund managers can engage to provide responsible entity services for a managed investment scheme, called a responsible entity for hire.

== See also ==
- Corporations Act 2001
- Australian corporate law
- Australian Financial Services Licence
