= Master–feeder investment structure =

The master–feeder structure is a technique for structuring investment funds. It allows asset managers to capture the efficiencies of larger pools of assets (see economics of scale) although fashioning investment funds to separate market niches.

One or more investment vehicles pool their portfolios within another vehicle – several smaller feeder funds contribute to one master fund.

Sometimes, especially when the feeders are hedge funds, this is a way of complying with the legal systems of distinct jurisdictions. For example, an onshore feeder fund and an offshore feeder fund contribute to the same master portfolio.

This is also sometimes called a hub and spoke structure.

== Tax concerns ==
For a U.S. taxable investor, the ownership of shares in what is known as a "passive foreign investment company" or PFIC can prove to be very tax-expensive. The offshore feeder fund almost always meets the definition of a PFIC. An (onshore) master fund does not, so the transaction is set up so that the master fund is a partnership for U.S. tax purposes, which effectively provides insulation between the US based investor and the PFIC feeder.

== See also ==
- Fund administration
- Fund governance
