= Charitable investment fundraiser =

In Australia, charitable investment fundraisers (CIF) are not-for-profit entities with charitable purposes that take deposits from the public to finance those charitable purposes. CIFs may apply for an exemption from the requirement to hold an Australian Financial Services Licence (AFSL) if the “financial products” they provide is limited to the issue of debentures or the running of managed investment schemes. For example, the solicitation of secured loans that are paid back with interest are considered debentures. Such deposit taking entities have since 2003 also been exempted from certain requirements of the Banking Act 1959.

CIFs must be registered with the Australian Charities and Not-for-profits Commission, and, as charities, may also enjoy tax and other exemptions and benefits, such as deductible gift recipient status and exemption from income tax.

In 2013, ASIC estimated that there were more than 200 CIFs, with the largest funds being those operated by the Australian Catholic Bishops' Conference.

== AFSL exemptions ==
Normally, an organisation that offers a "financial product" is required by Chapter 7 of the Corporations Act 2001 (Cth) to obtain an Australian Financial Services Licence (AFSL), unless an exemption applies. By an instrument in 2002 under the Corporations Act, Australian Securities and Investments Commission (ASIC) granted certain AFSL exemptions to CIFs including:

- exemptions from the application of the debenture, managed investment scheme and fundraising provisions of the Corporations Act, and
- exemption from the requirement to hold an AFSL, if the only financial products issued were debentures or managed investment schemes.

To obtain the exemptions, the CIF would apply to ASIC and provide an “identification statement” (a much less onerous disclosure statement than for regulated investment schemes). The CIF also needed to make clear to investors that their products are not fully regulated by ASIC.

After the Australian Charities and Not-for-profits Commission (ACNC) was established in 2012, CIFs were required to be registered with the ACNC to be entitled to the exemptions.

In 2013, a consultative paper sought submissions on proposed amendments to the exemptions under Regulatory Guide 87. Changes were made in 2016 which:

- increased the amount of information to be included in the identification statement, with pre-existing charities having until 31 March 2017 to lodge new identification statements.
- since 1 January 2017, CIFs have not been permitted to issue at-call or investments with a term of less than 31 days to retail investors.
- since 1 January 2018, CIFs have been required to obtain an AFSL, unless if the CIF is a “wholesale CIF”. A wholesale CIF is one that has:
  - net assets of at least $2.5 million,
  - has had gross income of at least $250,000 over the previous two years, and
  - does not offer its financial products to non-associated retail investors.

None of the changes apply to fundraising from donations or bequests, in which there is no expectation of repayment.

CIFs that have been granted exemptions by ASIC, and do not hold an AFSL, must disclose that investments in the fund are not subject to the usual protections for investors under the Corporations Act 2001 or regulation by ASIC.

In 2013, ASIC estimated that more than 200 CIFs were collectively managing more than $7 billion on behalf of wholesale and retail investors. The investments were mainly in the form of debentures, investment funds and interests in managed investment schemes. The largest funds were those of the Australian Catholic Bishops' Conference, with 24 funds holding deposits totaling $7.49 billion.

== Banking Act exemptions ==
In Australia, taking deposits from the public is classified as a banking activity and is highly regulated under the Banking Act 1959 (Cth). However, the Australian Prudential Regulation Authority (APRA) has since 2003 exempted from certain requirements of the Banking Act entities formed for religious and charitable purposes, called religious charitable development funds (RCDFs), that take deposits (termed “investments”) from the public, subject to a number of conditions.

Changes were made in 2016, which came into effect on 1 January 2017, to restrict RCDFs being seen by the public as quasi-banks. If a RCDF offers an account to a retail investor without a stated term, the account will now have a minimum notice period of 31 days before a withdrawal, and any account offered to a retail investor that is a term investment is required to state a term of at least 31 days. RCDFs are now precluded from offering transactional accounts, such as cheque accounts, access to ATMs, EFTPOS, etc. The exemption order and list of complying RCDFs was updated in 2017.

RCDFs that have been granted an exemption by APRA are require to disclose to investors that the fund is not a bank and is not prudentially supervised by APRA, and that investors do not receive the benefit of the financial claims scheme or the depositor protection provisions in the Banking Act 1959. They are also required to tell investors that they may be unable to get their money back.

There are currently about 60 RCDFs registered with APRA that have been granted an exemption. Between them, these funds have more than $7 billion in retail deposits.

== See also ==
- Australian Charities and Not-for-profits Commission
