= M&G Recovery Fund =

- Company type: Private
- Industry: Open-ended investment company
- Founded: 23 May 1969

M&G Recovery Fund is a British open-ended investment company launched on 23 May 1969 and, as of 31 May 2012, was the third-largest open-ended fund in the UK (behind Neil Woodford's two equity income funds) with £7.4 billion of assets.

It was managed by Tom Dobell between 2000 and 2020, with deputies Michael Stiasny and David Williams since January 2011. Michael Stiasny was appointed manager in 2021. The fund makes a charge of 1.5% per annum.

Its investment focus is investing 'in a diversified range of securities issued by companies which are out of favour, in difficulty or whose future prospects are not fully recognised by the market. The sole aim of the Fund is capital growth.'
