= DollarDEX =

dollarDEX, founded in 1998 in Singapore, is one of the earliest financial supermarkets in Asia. It offers clients a selection of products—loans, insurance, investments (unit trusts/mutual funds, alternative investment vehicles), financial advice—sourced from banks, insurance companies, and fund managers around the world. The company is operated by Navigator Investment Services (NISL).
