= Special limited partnership =

A Special Limited Partnership (SLP) is the Luxembourg version of the similar British Limited Partnership.

== Key Characteristics of the SLP ==
=== A limited Partnership ===
The SLP is composed of at least one general partner ("GP") and one or several limited partner(s). The partner may be a GP and an LP at the same time. While the GP is jointly and separately liable for any commitments of the company on their private assets and property, the liability of the LP is limited to the extent of their contributed participation interest. Thus, any liability incurred by the SLP within its incorporation, operational business or its liquidation will be considered as a commitment of the SLP in this respect.

=== Absence of legal personality ===
The SLP does not have any legal personality distinct from its partners.

=== Management of the SLP ===
A GP may but is not obliged to act as a manager of the SLP. An LP may act as manager, director, or agent of a manager of the SLP. In addition, the management of the SLP may be delegated by the GPs to an AIFM, which shall for the execution of its mandate be appointed as manager.

== Limited Partnership Agreement (LPA) ==
=== Contractual flexibility ===
One of the main advantages of the SLP is its contractual flexibility. The GPs and LPs define all the terms and conditions in the relevant limited partnership agreement (LPA), including the operational and organizational minutiae.

The LPA can take the form of a notarial deed or a private agreement. Furthermore, only an extract of the LPA must be filed with the Luxembourg Trade and Companies Register and subsequently published in the Memorial C. The mandatory content of the extract comprises only the denomination, the time period, a precise designation of the GPs and designation of the managers and their signatory powers.

=== Voting rights and majority rights ===
The partners of the SLP are granted voting rights proportionally to their participation interests held in the company. However, the allocation of the voting rights may be freely determined by the partners in the LPA. Therefore, it is possible that participation interest even may have no voting right at all.

=== LPA Aspects ===
An LPA should typically cover at least the following aspects

- Voting rights;
- Partners decision;
- Transfer of partnership interests;
- Addition of partners;
- Increase in capital commitment;
- Amount and priority of distributions;
- Special allocation;
- Repayment of partners loans or capital;
- Management;
- Excuse and exclusion procedures;
- Reports to Partners;
- Confidentiality;
- Audit;
- Rights of Partners;
- Liability of Partners;
- Dissolution;
- Termination;
- Dispute Jurisdiction

== Differences between Luxembourg and the UK ==
The main difference between the UK legislation and the Luxembourg SLP lays in the governance and liability rules. The Luxembourg Law foresees a list of internal actions that can be undertaken by the LPs without constituting illicit acts of management and allowing them to maintain their limited liability. This is not the case for limited partnerships set up in the UK.

In addition, the Luxembourg SLP does not require a profit share to be distributed to the GPs contrary to the UK where all partners receive a part of the profit.

There is no limitation on the proportion of financing provided by equity or partners loans in the SLP whereas there must be at least 1% of equity financing in the UK.

== Regulatory framework ==
Luxembourg partnerships are not per se subject to a specific regulatory status. It is, therefore, possible to use the SLP for setting up a regulated investment entity either in form of a SICAV under the specialized investment fund regime or an Investissement à capital risque (SICAR) in accordance with the law of the 15 June 2004 on investment companies in risk capital.

An SLP set up under the SIF Law or the SICAR Law will have to comply, in addition to the rules of the Company Law, with the rules set out in the relevant fund regulation.

== Accounting requirements ==
=== Unregulated SLP ===
The annual accounts do not have to be filed nor consolidated under the Luxembourg Trade and Companies Register. The SLP is free to choose the accounting principles to apply(LuxGeneral accepted accounting principles, IFRS or others). The appointment of an auditor is not required.

=== Regulated SLP ===
If the SLP is used as an investment vehicle, it must comply with the accounting requirements provided by the SIF and SICAR laws.

== Tax ==
=== Regulated SLP ===
The SLP set up as a SIF benefits from an exemption of income and wealth taxes. It will only be subject to the subscription tax of 0,01% per annum calculated on the net asset value.

=== Unregulated SLP ===
The unregulated SLP is transparent for CIT (Corporate Income Tax) and NWT (Net Worth Tax). The partners are indeed considered to carry out individually the activity of the entity.

In order to achieve full tax transparency, it should, however, still be ensured that the unregulated SLP does not perform a commercial activity per se.

While the management of private wealth is regarded as falling outside the definition of commercial activity, an analysis would have to be made on a case-by-case basis.

== Notes ==
- "Special Limited Partnership" - Information Platform for SLPs
- "Limited Partnership in Luxembourg" - LPEA
