= Common fund =

Form of collective investment based on contractual law

A common fund is a form of collective investment scheme based upon contractual law rather than being enacted through a trust, corporation or insurance policy.

The model for this type of arrangement is the Fonds commun de placement common in France and Luxembourg. The common contractual fund in Ireland is another prominent example.

== See also ==
- Collective investment scheme
- Fonds commun de placement
- Common contractual fund
