= Fund administration =

Execution of back office activities in support of an investment fund

Fund administration is the name given to the execution of back office activities including fund accounting, financial reporting, net asset value calculation, capital calls, distributions, investor communications and other functions carried out in support of an investment fund, which may take the form of a traditional mutual fund, a hedge fund, a private equity fund, a venture capital fund, a pension fund, a unit trust, or other pooled investment vehicle.

Managers of funds often choose to outsource some or all of these activities to external specialist companies, such as the fund's custodian bank or transfer agent. These companies are known as fund administrators.

== Administration services ==
=== United States ===
These administrative activities may include the following administrative functions, which in turn may include "fund accounting" services. Some of these items may be specific to fund operations in the US, and some pertain only whether the fund is an SEC-registered fund:

- Calculation of the net asset value ("NAV"), including the calculation of the fund's income and expense accruals and the pricing of securities at current market value, is a core administrator task, because it is the price at which investors buy and sell shares in the fund. This involves trade capture; security valuation (for highly illiquid securities, considerations include whether counterparty valuations are available and/or appropriate and whether the securities can be valued by independent vendors); reconciliations; expense calculation; and NAV calculation and reporting. The accurate and timely calculation of NAV by the administrator is vital.
- Preparation of semi-annual and annual reports to shareholders
- Maintenance and filing of the fund's financial books and records as the fund accountant, including reconcilement of holdings with custody and broker records
- Payment of fund expenses
- Settlement of daily purchases and sales of securities, ensuring collection of dividends and interests
- Calculation and payment to the transfer agent of dividends and distributions (if required)
- Preparation and filing of the fund's prospectus
- Preparation and filing of other SEC filings/reports
- Calculation of the total returns and other performance measures of the fund
- Monitoring investment compliance with SEC, prospectus or U.S. Internal Revenue Code restrictions
- Supervision of the orderly liquidation and dissolution of the fund (if required)

This list is not exhaustive, and particularly where a fund manager has chosen to outsource some of these tasks to an external company, some or all of the administrative activities of the fund may or may not be described as "fund administration". Specific activities that definitely do not fall under fund administration are those directly associated with the marketing and development of a collective investment scheme:

- Gathering assets (i.e., seeking additional investors into the fund)
- Asset management (i.e., deciding how to spend the money that investors have put into the fund in order to obtain the best return for that investment)

In the view of some fund managers, any task necessary for maintenance of the fund that does not fall into one of the two categories above could be classed as fund administration, and could potentially be a candidate for outsourcing.

The 'credit crisis' of the early 2010s had a significant effect on providers of fund administration services.

=== Europe ===
Referred to as collective investment management, fund management in Europe covers services such as NAV calculation, investment compliance, regulatory and financial reporting.

== Fund administrator liability ==
Anwar v. Fairfield Greenwich (SDNY, 2010) is the major case relating to fund administrator liability for failure to handle its NAV-related obligations properly. The case was a consolidated proceeding against defendants that provided auditing and hedge fund administration and management services to investor plaintiffs whose investments were lost in the Bernard Madoff Ponzi scheme. Defendants were entities and individuals associated with among others Fairfield Greenwich Group, Citco Group Ltd ("Citco"), and GlobeOp Financial Services. Investors accused the defendants of collecting hundreds of millions of dollars in fees for their services, while ignoring warning signs that should have alerted them to the existence of Madoff’s fraud. Plaintiffs alleged they lost $7.5 billion.

The defendants settled in 2016 by paying the Anwar plaintiffs $235 million.

Before the case settled, the court held that although the administration agreements did not explicitly name plaintiff investors as third-party beneficiaries, plaintiffs satisfactorily alleged intent to permit third-party enforcement given that the administration agreements requirement that the Citco defendants render certain specific performance directly to plaintiffs. The court also held that plaintiffs adequately alleged that there was a discrete group of potential investors who were known parties to the Administrators, and that the Administrators intended those investors to rely upon the NAV to invest in the Funds. In addition, the court held that the Administrator sending NAV statements to interested investor parties was sufficient to allege a "linking" requirement.

The court held that the case was parallel with Pension Comm. of Univ. of Montreal Pension Plan v. Banc of Am. Sec., 592 F. Supp.2d 608, 641 (SDNY 2009), in which

The NAV, which was to be independently calculated and reported by [the Administrators], was fundamental to Plaintiffs' initial investment decisions, decisions to invest additional funds, and decisions to maintain the investments over time. The number of shares that the Plaintiffs received in exchange for their investment amounts depended on [the Administrators'] NAV calculations. Plaintiffs' subsequent reported profits also turned on [the Administrators'] calculations. Therefore, Plaintiffs necessarily relied on [the Administrators'] NAV calculations.

The court held further that "As in Pension Committee, ... it is reasonable to infer from Plaintiffs' allegations that the Administrators were aware that Plaintiffs would—and did—rely on their statements of the Funds' NAVs that were sent to the investors.... Accordingly, the Court finds that Plaintiffs allege a relationship between the investors and the Administrators that gives rise to a duty of care ...."

== See also ==
- Fund governance
- Investment management
- Hedge fund
