= Expense ratio =

Measure of a security's administration costs

The expense ratio is a term used in investment management or corporate finance to analyze the annual cost of owning an investment fund or operating a business or nonprofit organization.

== In investment management ==
The expense ratio of an investment fund is the total percentage of assets under management used for administrative, management, advertising and promotion (12b-1 fees), and all other expenses, expressed on an annual basis. These expenses are paid by the fund shareholders, either from dividends received from the underlying assets or from proceeds of asset sales by the fund. An expense ratio of 1% per annum means that each year 1% of the fund's total assets will be used to cover expenses. Over time, a high expense ratio can significantly affect the overall returns of a fund. The expense ratio does not include commissions or performance fees.

In some cases, fund sponsors will temporary waive or reduce expense ratios to attract investment.

== In corporate finance ==
In corporate finance, the expense ratio measures operational efficiency and represents what percentage of total revenue is used for operating expenses. It is calculated as follows:

$$\frac{\mbox{Operating Expenses}}{\mbox{Total Revenue}} = \mbox{Expense Ratio}\;$$

== In nonprofit organizations ==
In nonprofit organizations, the term "program expense ratio" refers to program expenses divided by total expenses. This is one of the primary financial indicators of concern to charities and their donors. The sum of the program expense ratio and the "support service expense ratio" is by definition 100% for a non-profit organization. Charities having a higher program expense ratio (and thus a lower support service expense ratio) are often considered to be more efficient.

The support service expense ratio is also commonly called the "overhead". The expense ratio (i.e. "overhead") can be an important indicator, especially if it is at one extreme or another, but generally speaking it is just as important to look at other factors including transparency, governance, leadership, and results.

The U.S. median for the support service expense ratio is 10%. Expense ratios were less than 30% for most of the charities ranked by Charity Navigator.

== See also ==
- Operating expense
- Total expense ratio
