= Fund derivative =

Type of financial product

A fund derivative (see also derivative) is a financial structured product related to a fund, normally using the underlying fund to determine the payoff. This may be a private equity fund, mutual fund or hedge fund. Purchasers obtain exposure to the underlying fund (or funds) whilst improving their risk profile over a direct investment.

== Example ==
For example, the purchaser may be attracted by a fund's star manager, performance history or strategy, whilst improving their counter-party risk and getting leverage, currency hedging or a capital guarantee via the derivative.

== Features ==
The structured product may be investible by retail clients or institutional investors that would not otherwise buy the fund, because of its provision of safeguard features such as capital guarantees or the appointment of independent administrators to calculate the underlying fund's value and additional oversight mechanisms.

== Types ==
Fund derivatives might be a call option on a fund, a CPPI on a fund, or a leveraged note on a fund. More complicated structures might include auto-call features guaranteeing that if the derivative reached a certain value that value was locked in, on top of an initial minimum value guarantee at issuance. Maturities might range from three to ten years, or more rarely multiple decades. The big players in this field are investment banks such as Barclays Investment Bank, BNP Paribas, TPG, Citigroup, Credit Suisse, Deutsche Bank, Goldman Sachs, Macquarie Group, Morgan Stanley, Société Générale, UBS Investment Bank.

Fund derivatives have experienced significant growth over the past decade, although they remain an evolving segment of the broader derivatives market. New structures continue to be developed in response to changing market conditions and client demand.
