= Fonds commun de placement =

Fonds commun de placement (FCPs) translates to "investment funds" or "mutual funds", and are open-ended collective investment funds. The legal structure is neither a trust or a company and are more like an open ended partnership. They are similar to common contractual funds in Ireland, tax transparent funds in the UK and fondsen voor gemene rekening in the Netherlands.

In France, FCPs are collective investments that are similar to a SICAV. They are not investment companies. They have no independent legal status but exist as a set of defined relationships between investors, managers and custodians. They invest in different financial instruments, but they do not have the tax status of a SICAV.

They are typically issued in the French-speaking countries of Europe.

== See also ==
- Common fund
- Collective investment scheme
