= Australian Catholic Bishops' Conference =

Assembly of Catholic bishops

Logo of the Conference

The Australian Catholic Bishops' Conference (ACBC) is the national episcopal conference of the Catholic bishops of Australia and is the instrumentality used by the Australian Catholic bishops to act nationally and address issues of national significance. Formation of the ACBC was approved by the Holy See on 21 June 1966. With around 5.4 million Catholics in Australia, the ACBC is an influential national body.

== Membership ==
Membership of the Conference comprises bishops from 34 dioceses and ordinariates from 28 territorial dioceses and from 6 other structures, specifically the Eastern Catholic dioceses for Chaldean, Maronite, Melkite and Ukrainian Catholics; a military ordinariate; and an Anglican ordinariate, the Personal Ordinariate of Our Lady of the Southern Cross.

== Organisation ==
The conference has a president and a vice-president (each elected for two years), a permanent committee and various bishops commissions (in which each member is elected for three years) and a general secretariat. The bishops come together twice a year for a week in May and November.

Individual bishops retain considerable independence, and the president relies on collective support. The present leadership of the ACBC is as follows:

- President: Archbishop Timothy Costelloe SDB, Archbishop of Perth. Currently serving 3rd and final term (2026–2028) and President since May 2022
- Vice-President: Bishop Gregory Bennet, Bishop of Sale. Currently serving 2nd term (2026–2028) and Vice-President since May 2024
- General secretary: Very Rev Fr Chris de Souza

== Activities and influence ==
The Australian Catholic Bishops Conference meets at least annually and has a Permanent Committee, bishops' commissions and the General Secretariat to ensure the work of the Conference continues between meetings. The Conference has a Public Policy Office which provides advice on a range of contemporary issues, especially legal-political and bioethical matters and produces submissions for government and other national bodies. The General Secretariat has continuing tasks of liaison with the Apostolic See, the Commonwealth Government and other national bodies.

According to the Australian National University's John Warhurst, the ACBC is "among the most influential pressure groups in Australian politics today". The Sydney Morning Herald wrote in 2016: "There are about 5.4 million Catholics in Australia, according to the 2011 census, and the ACBC is the peak organising body for the church's bishops. Unlike other minor Christian lobby groups, it rarely comments on federal politics and is fiercely non-partisan."

=== Social justice statements ===
Each year the conference issues a major statement on Social Justice Sunday (the last Sunday in August) and produces related materials including leaflets, prayer cards, liturgy notes, community education resources, powerpoints etc. Topics covered include matters such as refugees, poverty alleviation, indigenous advocacy, protecting the family and the environment and other social topics aligning with Catholic teaching.

=== Indigenous affairs ===
The ACBC is active in seeking improvements to the welfare of Indigenous Australians. Their 2006 Social Justice Statement entitled The Heart of Our Country: Dignity and justice for our Indigenous sisters and brothers, noted that "The Bishops have frequently commented on issues relating to Indigenous peoples, twice in the major Social Justice Statements. In 1978 Aborigines – A Statement of Concern was published, then in 1987 an ecumenical message, A Just and Proper Settlement, which anticipated the Bicentennial celebrations of 1988. These statements addressed the dispossession of Indigenous people that took place as a result of European settlement and colonisation of their land and the need for a just resolution of the painful consequences."

The ACBC lobbied for the Apology to Australia's Indigenous peoples for the stolen generations, which came in 2008 and which it called "an historic and prophetic moment in the life of the Australian nation" while urging increased efforts to improve the practical circumstances of Indigenous Australians.

=== Fundraising ===
In July 2013, the Conference made a submission to ASIC relating to continuing exemptions of charitable investment fundraisers (CIFs) from certain fundraising and licensing provisions under the Corporations Act 2001 (Cth), the largest CIFs being Catholic funds.

=== Marriage law debate ===
The ACBC has lobbied in support of sustaining the Catholic understanding of marriage. In May 2015 the Conference produced a booklet entitled, "Don't mess with Marriage".

The ACBC was a significant lobby-group in relation to the Australian Marriage Law Postal Survey. It campaigned for the No side, saying: "Vote No, to keep marriage as a unique relationship between a woman and a man... the consequences of changing marriage are very real".

=== Ruddock Religious Freedom Review ===
The ACBC has called on protections for religious organisations to be maintained in Australian law. In a submission to the Ruddock Religious Freedom Review, the ACBC said Church teaching “makes it clear that a gay person should be assessed for employment on the same basis as anyone else” but called for a religious freedom act to protect religious exemptions to discrimination law, saying that the freedom for its schools to “employ staff who embrace Christianity is essential for providing effective religious education and faith formation to their students”.

=== Refugees and asylum seekers ===
The ACBC has called on successive Australian governments to improve the treatment of asylum seekers, and has deployed significant church resources toward the support of refugees in Australia. It has lobbied for an increase to overall refugee intake, an ending off-shore and mandatory detention; for the removal of children from detention; and for abolishing Australia's temporary protection visa system.

=== Institutional victims of abuse ===
The conference welcomed Prime Minister Scott Morrison's apology to institutional victims of child sexual abuse in 2018.

=== Response to the recommendations of the royal commission into child sexual abuse ===
In August 2018, the ACBC released a response to the royal commission's report. It "accepted or accepted in principle or supported 98 per cent of the Royal Commission's recommendations". The one recommendation that was not accept was Recommendation 7.4, which involves breaking the seal of the confessional, saying "it is contrary to our faith and inimical to religious liberty".

== See also ==
- Apostolic Nunciature to Australia
- Catholic Church in Australia
