= Unit trust =

Form of collective investment

A unit trust is a form of collective investment constituted under a trust deed. A unit trust pools investors' money into a single fund, which is managed by a fund manager. Unit trusts offer access to a wide range of investments, and depending on the trust, it may invest in securities such as shares, bonds, gilts, and also properties, mortgage and cash equivalents. Those investing in the trust own "units", whose price is called the "net asset value" (NAV). The number of these units is not fixed and when more is invested in a unit trust (by investors opening accounts or adding to their accounts), more units are created.

In addition to the UK, trusts are found in Fiji, Ireland, the Isle of Man, Guernsey, Jersey, New Zealand, Australia, Kenya, Uganda, Tanzania, Namibia, South Africa, Singapore, Malaysia and Zimbabwe.

== History ==
The first unit trust was launched in the UK in 1931 by M&G under the inspiration of Ian Fairbairn. The rationale behind the launch was to emulate the comparative robustness of US mutual funds through the 1929 Wall Street crash. The first trust called the 'First British Fixed Trust' held the shares of 24 leading companies in a fixed portfolio that was not changed for the fixed lifespan of 20 years. The trust was relaunched as the M&G General Trust and later renamed as the Blue Chip Fund.

By 1939 there were around 100 trusts in the UK, managing funds in the region of £80 million.

== Different investment structures ==
There are a number of collective investment schemes — Unit Trust, Open-ended investment company, Mutual fund, Unit investment trust, Closed-end fund — with similar objectives and/or names, sometimes confused with each other. Variations include open-ended and closed-ended, business trust or management company/corporate structure, Actively managed or un-managed.

In the UK there are generally two types of open-ended, actively managed investment companies:

- Unit Trusts - which are organized as a business trust where the legal owner of the underlying assets is the trustee and the investors/unit-holders are beneficiaries. Unit Trusts have a "bid–offer spread", i.e. the investor pays more to buy units of the trust than they receive when they sell them—a difference that can vary and goes to the trust management as a profit.
- Open-ended investment company - which are legally companies, not trusts. They have a single price for both purchase and sale of units (no bid–offer spread), making them similar to European SICAVs and U.S. mutual funds.

In Western Europe there are

- SICAV - (société d'investissement à capital variable) is an open-ended collective investment scheme common in Western Europe, especially Luxembourg, Switzerland, Italy, Spain, Belgium, Malta, France and the Czech Republic.
- SICAF - (Société d'Investissement À Capital Fixe) is similar to a closed-end fund.

In the United States

- Mutual funds - in the form of open-ended, actively managed funds have traditionally been a very popular form of collective investment. Like Unit Trusts, their investors are unit-holders, and there are not a finite number of units in issue. Units could be increased or decreased depending on the net sales and repurchase by existing unit holders. Unlike Unit trusts they are limited liability companies where investors are like shareholders in a company. While open-ended mutual funds do not have a bid–offer spread, they may have "loads" (sale charges) and other fees paid to fund management.
- Closed-end funds - a collective investment model based on issuing a fixed number of shares which are not redeemable from the fund. Even more different from a unit trust, investors own shares rather than units. They buy and sell the shares on the stock market, rather than from the fund itself. New shares are not created by managers to meet demand from investors.
- Exchange-traded funds (ETFs) - also traded in the market and not bought and redeemed from the fund, but unlike closed-end funds the price is not completely determined by the valuation of the market, and trades in a narrow range very close to its net asset value, because the structure of ETFs allows major market participants to redeem shares of an ETF for a "basket" of the fund's underlying assets. (More than US$2 trillion were invested in ETFs in the United States between when they were introduced in 1993 and 2015.)
- Unit investment trust - an exchange-traded fund with a fixed (unmanaged) portfolio of securities and a fixed life-span before it liquidates and distributes its net asset value as proceeds to the unit-holders. Despite its similar name and being a trust, it differs from a unit trust in being closed-end, un-managed, and having a termination date.

== Structure ==
- Unitholders are the owners of trust property and the trustee administers the trust.
- The trustee has a fiduciary duty to ensure that unit holders are treated equally.
- The fund manager is appointed by the trustee to manage the investment of the trust assets.
- The fund manager runs the trust for a management fee and sometimes for a performance fee.
- Trust profits are either distributed to unitholders as income or reflected in the unit prices as capital gain if unrealised.
- The trustee ensures the fund manager keeps to the fund's investment objective.
- The trustee or fund manager can appoint a custodian to safeguard the trust assets.
- The trustee is required to maintain a registry to allow the transaction of units.

=== Open-ended ===
Unit trusts are open-ended; the fund is equitably divided into units which vary in price in direct proportion to the variation in value of the fund's net asset value. Each time money is invested, new units are created to match the prevailing unit buying price; each time units are redeemed the assets sold match the prevailing unit selling price. In this way there is no supply or demand created for units and they remain a direct reflection of the underlying assets. Unit trust trades do not have any commission.

=== Bid–offer spread ===
The fund manager makes a profit in the difference between the purchase price of the unit or offer price and the sale value of units or the bid price. This difference is known as the bid–offer spread. The bid–offer spread will vary depending on the type of assets held and can be anything from a few basis points on very liquid assets like UK/US government bonds, to 5% or more on assets that are harder to buy and sell such as property. The trust deed often gives the manager the right to vary the bid–offer spread to reflect market conditions, with the purpose of allowing the manager to control liquidity. In some jurisdictions the bid–offer spread is referred to as the "bid–ask spread".

To cover the cost of running the investment portfolio the manager will collect an annual management charge or AMC. Typically this is 1 to 2 percent of the market value of the fund. In addition to the annual management charge, costs incurred in managing and dealing the underlying assets will often be borne by the trust. If this is the case, the provider will extract revenue equal to the AMC without incurring any expenses managing the fund. This makes the charges in such vehicles lack transparency.

=== Mechanics ===
In a unit trust, units are managed within what is known as the "Managers Box". The Box Manager of the fund will make a decision at each valuation point whether or not to Create (add) or to Liquidate (Remove) units based on the final net sales and redemptions prior to the next valuation point where the Fund is priced on a "Forward Basis", or at the actual valuation point where the fund is priced on an Historic basis. Forward pricing is the most common.

The underlying value of the assets is always directly represented by the total number of units issued multiplied by the unit price less the transaction or management fee charged and any other associated costs. Each fund has a specified investment objective to determine the management aims and limitations.

A unit is created when money is invested and cancelled when money is divested. The creation price and cancellation price do not always correspond with the offer and bid price. Subject to regulatory rules these prices are allowed to differ and relate to the highs and lows of the asset value throughout the day. The trading profits based on the difference between these two sets of prices are known as the box profits.

=== OEIC conversion ===
In the UK many unit trust managers have converted to open-ended investment companies (OEICs) in recent years. OEICs normally have a single price for purchase and sale, although recent regulatory change now permits dual pricing too, in line with unit trusts.

The motivation for conversion is often cited as a simplification and precursor to offering funds Europe-wide under EU rules.

More cynical observers may have noted that there is increased latitude to hide charges in the OEIC Dilution Adjustment (more commonly referred to as "Swinging Single Price") whilst maintaining the veneer of simplification.

=== Taxation ===
In the United States, unitholders of Unit Trust Funds are often treated as partners for tax purposes. Much like investments in MLPs, unitholders are typically issued a K-1 rather than a Form 1099 at the end of each tax year.

== Ways to invest ==
In the UK, units can be bought direct from the fund manager, held through a nominee account or through an individual savings account (ISA). It is also possible to invest via fund platforms.

From 1 January 1987 to 5 April 1999 it was also possible to invest via a personal equity plan (PEP) however these were discontinued and all PEP accounts automatically became stocks and shares ISAs on 6 April 2008.

== See also ==
- Collective investment scheme
- Open-ended investment company
- Investment trust
