= Common contractual fund =

Irish tax free structure

A common contractual fund (CCF) is a collective investment scheme structure in Ireland introduced by the European Communities UCITS Regulations, 2003.

The CCF is an unincorporated body established by a management company under which the participants by contractual arrangements participate and share in the property of the fund as co-owners (specifically tenants in common). It is modelled on the Luxembourg Fonds commun de placement or FCP structure. Although the CCF could only be established as a UCITS when it was originally introduced in 2003, a non UCITS CCF can now be established pursuant to the Investment Funds, Companies and Miscellaneous Provisions Act 2005, which was enacted in June 2005.

== Purpose for establishing a CCF structure in Ireland ==
The majority of pension funds are entitled to favourable withholding tax treatment on investments. For instance, in the Netherlands, exempt Dutch pension funds qualify for a 0% withholding tax in the US in respect of dividends paid on their holdings in US equities. However, where a pension fund acquires US equities through a separate investment entity, dividend income will typically attract withholding tax.

For example, an exempt Dutch pension fund that invests in US equities through an Irish investment company will suffer a withholding tax of 30% on the dividends paid on US equities held by the Irish investment company. Assuming an average annual dividend return of 2% per annum on US equities, these withholdings represent an annual tax leakage of 60 basis points from the Irish collective scheme.

In turn, this tax leakage represents an equivalent underperformance by the underlying exempt Dutch pension fund. In order to address this issue, the Irish funds industry sought an intermediary structure for pension funds that would deliver optimal tax status so that the underlying pension fund's investment would be treated in the same way from a tax perspective as if it had made the investment directly. The result has been the common contractual fund.

The CCF not only presents advantages for pension funds but it is equally important for the investment managers of pension schemes who can consolidate their pension fund clients into one CCF. The primary advantage for the investment manager is the tax savings on investment returns. In addition, in managing only one fund structure rather than a number of fund structures, there should be economies of scale and operational efficiencies for the investment manager which should result in a lower cost base for the investment manager in providing its services to clients. This cost saving can either be retained by the investment manager or partly or fully passed on to clients to ensure that the investment manager retains a competitive advantage on pricing with its clients.

== Requirements for a Common Contractual Fund ==
As a CCF can be established as a UCITS fund or a non UCITS fund, the promoter of a CCF can elect to be subject to the investment objectives and policies of a UCITS fund or the broader investment objectives and policies that apply to certain non UCITS funds (such as qualifying investor funds).

The CCF is constituted under contract law by a deed (called a deed of constitution). The parties to the deed of constitution are the management company and the custodian, and the deed is executed under seal. The assets of the CCF will be entrusted to a custodian for safekeeping in the same manner as applies in the case of other funds authorised by the Central Bank of Ireland. As an unincorporated body, the CCF will not have separate legal personality. As a co-owner, each investor will hold an undivided co-ownership interest as a tenant in common with the other investors.

The CCF may be established as a single structure or an umbrella structure. The relevant legislation includes an express provision to the effect that a CCF established in an umbrella structure will not be subject to cross liability between funds in the umbrella. The CCF may issue different classes of units.

== Tax status of a Common Contractual Fund ==
The CCF is a tax transparent vehicle under Irish law. Pursuant to the Finance Acts, 2003 and 2005, no Irish taxes will be payable in respect of income and gains arising to a CCF on the basis that the income and gains will be regarded as accruing directly to the participants in the CCF in proportion to the value of their interests in the CCF. The CCF is intended to preserve direct access to tax treaty relief currently enjoyed by certain types of investors such as pension funds. Although the Finance Act, 2003 provided that only pension schemes could invest in the CCF, the Finance Act, 2005 has now broadened the category of investor that may invest in the CCF to any investors who are not individuals. Accordingly, only non individuals (such as, for example, companies, partnerships, pension funds and unit trusts) may invest in the CCF.

While the CCF is treated as tax transparent under Irish law, it will be a matter for the jurisdiction in which the investor is resident for tax purposes to determine whether similar tax treatment will be granted in that jurisdiction to the CCF. Similarly, the tax authority of the jurisdiction in which the income arises must also recognise the tax transparency of the CCF.

In order to facilitate the tax transparency, it is considered that the CCF should have the following characteristics which would distinguish it from a typical unit trust or investment company structure:

- (a) no meetings of investors should be permitted;
- (b) units should not be freely transferable but should be redeemable; and
- (c) no redemption charge should be levied.

It is also necessary that income derived from the CCF be distributed annually, in proportion to each investor's holding in the CCF. This will ensure that the income is both accounted for and taxed on a current basis. Investors will be provided with an annual breakdown of income by type and source.

Although tax advice should be obtained regarding the tax transparency status of any CCF in the jurisdictions in which the CCF's investors and underlying investments are located, indications are that the CCF is likely to be treated as tax transparent in the following jurisdictions: Austria, Belgium, Canada, France, Germany, Norway, Switzerland, the Netherlands and the United States. (Source: Arther Cox (Dublin))

As discussed in a recent Finance Week article, there are huge performance implications alone in using a CCF, compared to the same investment via an Irish Variable Capital Company (VCC). In the example given, if a fund manager invested £1bn in the MSCI Euro index and performed only equal to that index, a CCF would have created an additional return of £57.5 million over the past 10 years.

== See also ==
- Qualifying investor alternative investment fund (QIAIF)
- Irish Financial Services Regulatory Authority
- Common fund
