= Cayman Islands Directors Registration and Licensing Law, 2014 =

Cayman has introduced a new regime for the licensing and registration of directors of investment fund companies that are “regulated” under the Mutual Funds Law (2013 Revision) and directors of companies registered as “excluded persons” under paragraphs 1 and 4 of Schedule 4 of the Securities Investment and Business Law (2011 Revision). Each relevant entity is defined in the Law as a “Covered Entity”.

== Description ==
This Client Brief is important to anyone who either is or plans to become a director of a company categorized by the new legislation as a “Covered Entity”. Critically it is irrelevant where the director has his place of residence and the obligations set out under the Law (both initial and ongoing) are those of the individual and not any other entity.

The genesis of the Law is the Cayman Government's initiative to continually enhance standards of corporate governance and increase transparency in the sector. The Law is designed to enable the Cayman Islands Monetary Authority (“CIMA”) to, amongst other things, approve or deny applicants for registration or licensing as directors and retain detailed information on directors for the purposes of both assisting overseas regulatory authorities and carrying out its own regulatory functions.

The Law was brought into effect on 4 June 2014 (other than in relation to certain exceptions relating to the issue of the capacity of directors) and full compliance is therefore required by those already acting at the date of commencement, under the applicable grace periods, by close of business on 3 September 2014 for registered directors and professional directors and 3 December 2014 for corporate directors. Applicants proposing to act must be registered or licensed prior to their appointment as a director of a Covered Entity.

Given that the process is new, unanticipated issues may arise for an applicant and it is recommended that persons covered by the Law and their counsel start the registration or licensing process as soon as possible, particularly given that sanctions for non-compliance are significant and may delay the launch of a new investment fund. Each director must determine: (1) which of three relevant categories they fall within; (2) whether registration or licensing applies and the availability of an exemption; (3) the applicable timing and grace periods; (4) the fees and related deadlines for each category of director (as well as potential penalties); (5) the detailed requirements of the application process, which vary according to the category of director and the application; and (6) ongoing compliance

== Registration and Licensing of Directors of Covered Entities ==
=== Registered Director ===
Part II of the legislation provides that a natural person appointed as a director of a Covered Entity shall not act in that capacity unless registered under the Law. Non-compliance constitutes an offense and on conviction a fine of CI$50,000 (US$60,975) or 12 months imprisonment may be imposed.

CIMA may refuse to register an applicant if CIMA has information that the applicant: (a) has been convicted of a criminal offense involving fraud or dishonesty; or (b) is the subject of an adverse finding, financial penalty, sanction or disciplinary action by a regulator, self-regulatory organization or a professional disciplinary body. Confirmation of registration should be received within 48 hours of making the application.

=== Professional Director ===
Part III of the legislation provides that a natural person shall not act as a professional director (defined as acting for twenty or more Covered Entities) unless they hold a license under the Law. Non-compliance constitutes an offense and on conviction a fine of CI$100,000 (US$121,951) or 12 months imprisonment may be imposed. CIMA may not grant a license to an applicant unless it is satisfied that the applicant is a fit and proper person for licensing as a professional director. Section 12 of the Law further provides that in determining whether a natural person is a fit and proper person, regard shall be had to all circumstances, including that person's: (a) honesty, integrity and reputation; (b) competence and capability; and (c) financial soundness. Confirmation of licensing should be received within 4 weeks of making the application.

There is an exemption in Section 16(1) for directors associated with a Company Manager or a Mutual Fund Administrator Licensed with CIMA (although the director must register under Section 6 with certain supplemental information). Section 16(2) provides a similar exemption and registration requirement for directors associated with a CIMA Regulated Fund Manager that is Registered or Licensed with an Overseas Regulatory Authority.

“Overseas Regulatory Authority” is defined to include: US Securities and Exchange Commission (SEC), US Commodity and Futures Trading Commission (CFTC), US Financial Industry and Regulatory Authority (FINRA), Hong Kong Securities and Futures Commission (SFC), Japan Financial Services Agency (FSA), Monetary Authority of Singapore (MAS), UK Financial Conduct Authority (FCA), German Federal Financial Supervisory Authority (BaFin), French Authorite des Marches Financiers (France) (AMF), Netherlands Authority for the Financial Markets (Autoriteit Financiele Markten (AMF), The Central Bank of Ireland (CBI) and the Luxembourg Commission de Surveillance du Secteur Financier (CSSF), Dubai Financial Services Authority (DFSA), Comissão de Valores Mobiliários (CVM).

=== Corporate Director ===
Part IV of the legislation provides that a corporate director (defined as a body corporate acting as a director for a Covered Entity) shall not act in that capacity unless they are licensed as a corporate director under the Law. Penalties for non-compliance are the same as those for professional directors. CIMA may not grant a license to an applicant unless it is satisfied that the applicant is “fit and proper” and similar criteria to those used for a professional director are applied. Non-Cayman companies will not be permitted to act as directors of Covered Entities unless they register in the Cayman Islands under Part IX of the Companies Law (2013 Revision) and the Law provides detailed ongoing regulation for a corporate director with significant sanctions for non-compliance. Confirmation of licensing should be received within 4 weeks of making the application.

Note that the Law expressly excludes a corporate director who holds a Companies Management License or a Mutual Funds Administrators license (issued by CIMA) where the holder of the license is providing directors to or acting as a director for a client which is a Covered Entity.

=== CIMA's Application Process and General Issues ===
The required information for registration must be entered into CIMA's web-portal. Details of the web-portal are to be sent to directors by the registered office provider. Applications for licensing or registration from any source other than the web-portal will be disregarded by CIMA and will have no effect.

The registered office of each Covered Entity will obtain a list from CIMA with the unique identification number (“UIN”) for each director of a Covered Entity associated with that registered office provider. The registered offices will then contact each director and forward their UIN. Any duplicate UIN must be sent via email to CIMA at DirectorsRegistration@cimoney.com.ky. CIMA will confirm the correct UIN to be used by the director. The payment of fees can only be made via the web-portal with Visa or MasterCard.

The Law provides CIMA with very broad powers including, amongst other matters, the right to refuse or withdraw registration or licensing and extensive powers of enforcement. Annual filings, fees and twenty-one day filings are provided for with significant penalties for non-compliance. Insurance must be maintained by professional and corporate directors in accordance with the Law and details of the insurance filed with CIMA.

CIMA is required to keep a Register, however they have stated that the database will be maintained in accordance with the confidentiality provisions under Section 50 of the Monetary Authority Law (2013 Revision). The information will not be made available to the public and will be protected from any freedom of information requests. However the public will be able to search for a director's name to see whether he or she has been registered or licensed under the Law. CIMA has confirmed that the search results will only reveal the director's name, type of license or registration and its date of issue and number.

The Law, the related regulations and CIMA's FAQs can be found at: http://www.gazettes.gov.ky and http://www.cimoney.com.ky.
