= Alternative Investment Fund Managers Directive 2011 =

European Union financial regulation directive

Directive 2011/61/EU
- European Union directive
- Text with EEA relevance
- Title: Alternative Investment Fund Managers Directive
- Made by: European Parliament and Council of the European Union
- Made under: Art. 53
- Journal reference: L 174, 1 July 2011, p. 1–73

History
- Date made: 8 June 2011
- Entry into force: 21 July 2011

Alternative Investment Fund Managers Directive 2011 (2011/61/EU) is a directive of the European Union on the financial regulation of hedge funds, private equity, real estate funds, and other "Alternative Investment Fund Managers" (AIFMs) in the European Union. The Directive requires all covered AIFMs to obtain authorisation, and make various disclosures as a condition of operation. It followed the 2008 financial crisis. Before, the alternative investment industry had not been regulated at the EU level.

It was reported in May 2014 that only one-third of EU member states had successfully implemented the directive into law. As of 2014, the countries that had transposed Directive 2011/61/EU into law include Cyprus, the Czech Republic, the United Kingdom, Luxembourg, (Germany), France, Malta and Ireland. In December 2014, the European Commission issued a formal warning to countries including Spain, Latvia and Poland for not complying with implementation of Directive 2011/61/EU.

== Background ==
Directive 2011/61/EU was prompted as part of a wider regulatory effort undertaken by G20 nations following the 2008 financial crisis. Provisions of Directive 2011/61/EU include increasing transparency by AIFMs and assuring that national supervisors, the European Securities and Markets Authority (ESMA), and the European Systemic Risk Board (ESRB) have the information they need to monitor financial systems in the EU. Directive 2011/61/EU also is intended to protect investors.

On the need for the directive, an explanatory document from the European Commission stated that AIFMs had become "very significant actors in the European financial system, managing a large quantity of assets on behalf of pension funds and other investors; accounting for a significant proportion of trading activity in financial markets; and constituting an important source of counterparty risk for other market participants" and that they had "contributed to the build-up of leverage in the financial system, the consequences of which for the stability of financial markets became apparent when leverage in the hedge fund sector was rapidly unwound during the crisis".

When the directive was approved by the European Parliament, José Manuel Barroso, then President of the European Commission, said "The adoption of the directive means that hedge funds and private equity will no longer operate in a regulatory void outside the scope of supervisors. The new regime brings transparency and security to the way these funds are managed and operate, which adds to the overall stability of our financial system."

== Contents ==
=== Ch I, General provisions ===
The scope of the application of the directive is defined. The directives apply to EU AIFMs which manage one or more AIFs irrespective of whether such AIFs are EU AIFs or non-EU AIFs; non-EU AIFMs which manage one or more EU AIFs; and non-EU AIFMs which market one or more AIFs in the Union irrespective of whether such AIFs are EU AIFs or non-EU AIFs. Specific entities that are exempt from the directives are also listed.

=== Ch II, Authorisation ===
An AIFM must be authorised with the AIFM's home state regulator for AIFMs that have assets under management in AIFs above the thresholds of: (1) 100 million EUR, if the AIF uses leverage; or (2) 500 million EUR, if the AIF does not use leverage.

=== Ch III, Operating conditions for AIFMs ===
The reporting regulations of Directive 2011/61/EU require each AIF to be named using a series of codes, including its national identification code, the Bank Identifier Code (BIC) and the Legal Entity Identifier code. AIFMs must select only brokers and counterparties that are subject to regulatory supervision, that are financially sound, and that have the necessary organizational structure to provide services to the AIFM or the AIF. All AIFMs must submit quarterly, semi-annual, or annual reports to their respective member state regulator with information about the AIFM and its AIFs as well as an annual report with information such as the fund's financial statements, activities, and information about the total amount of remuneration paid by the AIFM to its staff.

=== Chs IV-V, Transparency requirements ===
Special requirements apply to AIFMs using leverage. AIFMs are required to disclose the extent of the leverage employed within their funds, and prove that leverage in any fund has been limited to a reasonable amount. The scope of Directive 2011/61/EU requirements that apply to AIFMs are different, depending on whether the AIFM is engaged in portfolio or risk management activities within the EU or markets its funds to EU investors. Each fund can only have one AIFM, though the AIFM can delegate certain functions to other entities. EU AIFMs became subject to all of the provisions of Directive 2011/61/EU once it was implemented at the EU member state level. Authorised fund managers located within the EU are permitted to market their EU funds to professional investors in any EU member state under what Directive 2011/61/EU calls a passport.

The reporting requirements of Directive 2011/61/EU apply to all AIFMs who manage or market alternative funds within the EU. To fulfill the reporting requirements, AIFMs must file an Annex IV report within 30 days of the end of the applicable reporting period, which is determined by the amount of an AIFM's assets under management. Reporting periods range from quarterly to half-yearly to annually. The Annex IV report is a government regulatory document comprising 41 questions, analysing a fund's investment portfolios, exposures, leverage ratios, liquidity and risk analysis.

In chapter V, section 2, articles 26–30, additional obligations apply for AIFs acquiring controlling influence in non-listed companies. This is essentially directed at private equity firms, and partly aims to stop asset stripping. Article 26(5) defines "control" as holding over 50% of voting rights, including as a ‘club deal’. This was watered down from 30% in the draft (formerly in article 26(1)(a)). Article 27(1) states that funds have to notify investee companies and shareholders when they acquire control, and article 28(4) requires them to disclose the acquisition to stakeholder groups including employees or representatives via the investee's board. Article 29 places an obligation on the central Private Equity management company (rather than an investee companies) to give information on operational and financial developments in firm's annual reports. Article 30 lists distribution requirements, which are intended to prevent asset stripping in the first 24 months from acquiring control).

=== Chs VI-VIII, Marketing and passport ===
For the purposes of the directive, marketing is defined as any offering or placement (sale) of an AIF at the initiative of the AIFM, or on behalf of the AIFM, to investors domiciled in the EU. Member state laws and rules determine whether a fund is engaged in marketing for purposes of the directive.

EU funds managed by EU managers may be marketed across the EU under the passport of Directive 2011/61/EU, provided the manager complies with all of the requirements of the directive. EU or non-EU funds managed by non-EU managers may currently be marketed within the EU only under national private placement regimes, as non-EU managers cannot obtain the marketing passport. Likewise, non-EU funds managed by EU managers may only be marketed under the private placement regimes. Funds marketed under national private placement regimes are subject to compliance with certain provisions of Directive 2011/61/EU related to reporting, regulatory co-operation agreements, and the jurisdiction of the fund and the manager not being listed as a "non-cooperative country and territory" by the Financial Action Task Force (FATF).

== Non-EU Passports ==
In 2015, an analyst for EurActiv.com, a European news and policy website, expressed concern that the directive puts non-EU funds at a disadvantage. In 2015, the European Securities and Markets Authority initiated a consultation to discuss issuing new rules to allow EU AIFMs to market their non-EU AIFs under the passport of Directive 2011/61/EU, and likewise for non-EU managers to market their funds under the passport. In July 2016 AIFM concluded that there were no fundamental obstacles to issuing passports to Canada, Guernsey, Japan, Jersey and Switzerland, seven other non-EU countries are also under consideration.

== Implementation ==
The directive came into force on 21 July 2011. On 16 November 2011, ESMA issued technical advice to the European Commission (EC) on possible implementation measures for Directive 2011/61/EU. On 19 December 2012, the EC added a series of new regulations to supplement the text. EU member states were required to write Directive 2011/61/EU into national law by no later than 22 July 2013. As of July 2014, not every EU member state had transposed Directive 2011/61/EU into national law. Some, but not all, member states provided for a one-year transition period, beginning 22 July 2013, before AIFMs would become subject to the requirements of Directive 2011/61/EU.

The directive has so far been supplemented by three Level II Regulations:

- Commission Delegated Regulation (EU) No 231/2013 on exemptions, general operating conditions, depositaries, leverage, transparency and supervision;
- Commission Implementing Regulation (EU) No 447/2013 on opt-in AIFMs;
- Commission Implementing Regulation (EU) No 448/2013 on the procedure for establishing the member state of reference for non-EU fund managers.

The European Securities and Markets Authority has also issued a number of guidelines to national competent authorities including on key concepts of Directive 2011/61/EU and remuneration.

=== Principality of Liechtenstein (1 April 2013) ===
Since 1 April 2013, the FMA Liechtenstein accepts applications for authorisation of AIFMs and AIFs as well as other persons and entities requiring authorisation under the AIFM Act. On 30 September 2016, the EEA Joint Committee, whose decisions result in the inclusion of new EU law in the EEA Agreement, decided to incorporate the first package of legal acts relating to the European Supervisory Authorities (ESAs).

=== Malta (27 June 2013) ===
On 27 June 2013 (the measures were released on 25 June 2013) Malta became the first EU Member State to complete the transposition of the requirements of the Directive into national law. The Maltese legislator and the Malta Financial Services Authority transposed the requirements of the Directive by means of a series of regulations issued under the Investment Services Act (Cap. 370, Laws of Malta) and a number of new MFSA rulebooks. = EU-Passport

=== Luxembourg (12 July 2013) ===
In Luxembourg, the AIFM directive was transposed into national law on 12 July 2013. According to the 2013 law an entity – in order to become an AIFM – will have to submit an application to, and obtain authorisation from, the Commission de Surveillance du Secteur Financier (CSSF). The application must include information on the directors of the AIFM, its shareholders, and the alternative investment funds (AIF), which it intends to manage and demonstrate how the entity will comply with the requirements of the AIFM Law.

=== France (27 July 2013) ===
The AIFM directive was transposed into France's national law on 27 July 2013.

== Reception ==
In a study conducted by Multifonds in June 2014, 72% of respondents from the EU and Canada said they expected non-EU managers to set up European operations in order to take advantage of Directive 2011/61/EU. In a 2014 study conducted by Preqin, 71% of American fund managers said they believed Directive 2011/61/EU would have a negative effect on the industry. Fund managers from within the EU, Asia and the rest of the world excluding the United States reported in 2014 and 2015 that Directive 2011/61/EU was costing them more than they had expected it to. Criticism of the costs of the legislation comes partly from industry lobbyists.

According to a study conducted by Deloitte, most of the UK-based asset managers think that the AIFM Directive could reduce the competitiveness of the EU's alternative investment funds industry because of the compliance the regulations impose on the industry. In addition, these managers from the hedge fund, private equity and real estate sectors believe that the directive will reduce the number of non-EU managers operating within the EU. Directive 2011/61/EU passed after contentious negotiations, especially between UK and French authorities, and because of its third-country provisions, which attracted considerable interest and engagement from U.S. authorities.

== See also ==
- EU law
- Directive 2014/65/EU
- Directive 2009/65/EC
