= Open-end fund =

Collective investment scheme

Open-end fund (or open-ended fund) is a collective investment scheme that can issue and redeem shares at any time. An investor will generally purchase shares in the fund directly from the fund itself, rather than from the existing shareholders. The term contrasts with a closed-end fund, which typically issues at the outset all the shares that it will issue, with such shares usually thereafter being tradable among investors.

Open-ended funds are available in most developed countries, but the terminology and operating rules vary. US mutual funds, UK unit trusts and OEICs, European SICAVs, and hedge funds are all examples of open-ended funds.

The price at which shares in an open-ended fund are issued or can be redeemed will vary in proportion to the net asset value of the fund and so directly reflects its performance.

== Fees ==
There may be a percentage charge levied on the purchase of shares or units. Some of these fees are called an initial charge (UK) or 'front-end load' (US). Some fees are charged by a fund on the sale of these units, called a 'close-end load,' that may be waived after several years of owning the fund. Some of the fees cover the cost of distributing the fund by paying commission to the adviser or broker that arranged the purchase. These fees are commonly referred to as "12b-1" fees in US.

Not all fund have initial charges; if there are no such charges levied, the fund is "no-load" (US).

These charges may represent profit for the fund manager or go back into the fund.

== Active management ==
Most open-end funds are actively managed, meaning that a portfolio manager picks the securities to buy, although index funds are now growing in popularity. Index funds are open-end funds that attempt to replicate an index, such as the S&P 500, and therefore do not allow the manager to actively choose securities to buy.

== Net asset value ==
The price per share, or NAV (net asset value), is calculated by dividing the fund's assets minus liabilities by the number of shares outstanding. This is usually calculated at the end of every trading day.

== Forward Pricing Rule 22c-1 ==
Based on the forward pricing rule (22c-1); funds and their principal underwriters, and dealers must sell interests in the fund based on the Net Asset Value (NAV) which is calculated daily. This helps to mitigate shareholder dilution, as well as increasing efficiency.

== Hedge funds ==
Hedge funds are typically open-ended and actively managed. However, investors can typically redeem shares only monthly or less frequently (e.g., quarterly or semi-annually).

== Examples ==
U.S. mutual funds:

- T. Rowe Price
- Fidelity Investments' Magellan
- The Vanguard Group's S&P 500
- PIMCO Total Return
- WorldCommodity Fund

== See also ==
- Collective investment schemes
- Mutual funds
- Unit trusts
- Open-ended investment company
- SICAVs
- Closed-end fund
- List of hedge funds
- List of private-equity firms
- List of investment banks
- Boutique investment bank
- Fund of funds
- Boutique investment bank
- Sovereign wealth fund
