= Total expense ratio =

Measure of the total cost of an investment fund

The total expense ratio (TER) is a measure of the total cost of a fund to an investor. Total costs may include various fees (purchase, redemption, auditing) and other expenses. The TER, calculated by dividing the total annual cost by the fund's total assets averaged over that year, is denoted as a percentage. It will normally vary somewhat from year to year.

Typically it consists of the annual management charge (AMC), the fee that the fund company charges annually to manage the fund (typically commission paid to fund managers), plus 'other' charges incurred with running the fund. These other charges can consist of share registration fees, fees payable to auditors, legal fees, and custodian fees. Not included in the total expense ratio are transaction costs as a result of trading of the fund's assets.

Because the TER is inclusive of these other charges, it is a more accurate measure of the 'drag' on a fund's performance than just using the annual management charge alone. In their advertisements and even their fact sheets, fund companies tend to give more emphasis to the AMC, making it difficult for a private investor (in the UK at least) to see the total expense ratio of the fund they are investing in. In the United States, however, it is mandatory not only to show it but also to make it as clear and as concise as possible.

Fund costs are very important: every dollar charged by a fund is a dollar that investors won't get, but costs can be offset to some extent – or even completely – by benefits.

Fund managers can benefit investors in a range of ways. These include:

- investing in assets that smaller direct investors cannot access;
- paying lower brokerage costs for buying and selling;
- using a range of risk reducing techniques; and
- taking advantage of managing a large pool of assets – often with regular inflows – to make ongoing adjustments to the fund efficiently and in ways that enhance returns, minimize losses, and/or reduce price volatility.

Fund managers also save investors time and effort by:

- providing summarized return and tax details and
- looking after the day-to-day paperwork and decision making that can be associated with holding a large number of investments.

Just as buying the cheapest car or house isn't always the best option; it could be a mistake just to invest in the lowest-cost fund. Some kinds of funds (e.g., cash funds) cost a lot less to run than others (e.g., diversified equity funds), but a good fund should do better – after fees – than any cash fund over the longer term. In general it seems that there is, at best, a positive correlation between the fees charged by a fund and the returns it provides to investors.

Once an investor has decided on a mix of assets (asset allocation) that suits their situation, needs, and goals, they need to know whether to invest through (more expensive) actively managed funds, cheaper ETFs (exchange traded funds), or directly. When considering using a managed fund, they should research what the manager does to earn their fees and the returns they are likely to achieve after fees.

Professional financial advisers who have a fiduciary duty towards their clients can help with determining the best trade-off between all of the different investment options available, looking at all of the characteristics, including the total expense ratio.

== See also ==
- Expense ratio
