= Undertakings for Collective Investment in Transferable Securities Directive 2009 =

EU directive on collective investment funds

The Undertakings for Collective Investment in Transferable Securities Directive (Directive 2009/65/EC, "UCITS") is a directive of the European Union (EU) that allows collective investment schemes to operate freely throughout the EU on the basis of a single authorisation from one member state. EU member states are entitled to have additional regulatory requirements for the benefit of investors.

== Evolution ==
The objective of Directive 85/611/EEC, adopted in 1985, was to allow for open-ended funds investing in transferable securities to be subject to the same regulation in every member state. It was hoped that once such legislative uniformity was established throughout Europe, funds authorised in one member state could be sold to the public in each member state without further authorisation, thereby furthering the EU's goal of a single market for financial services in Europe.

The reality differed somewhat from the expectation due primarily to individual marketing rules in each member state that created obstacles to cross-border marketing of UCITS. In addition, the limited definition of permitted investments for UCITS weakened the marketing possibilities of a UCITS. Accordingly, in the early 1990s proposals were developed to amend the 1985 Directive and more successfully harmonise laws throughout Europe.

These discussions, although leading to a draft UCITS II directive, were subsequently abandoned as being too ambitious when the Council of the European Union could not reach a common position.

In July 1998, the EU Commission published a new proposal which was drafted in two parts (a product proposal and a service provider proposal), which sought to amend the 1985 Directive. These proposals were finally adopted in December 2001, and are known as "UCITS III".

=== Management Directive ===
Directive 2001/107/EC seeks to give asset management companies a "European passport" to operate throughout the EU, and widens the activities which they are allowed to undertake. It also introduces the concept of a simplified prospectus, which is intended to provide more accessible and comprehensive information in a simplified format to assist the cross-border marketing of UCITS throughout Europe.

=== Product Directive ===
The primary aim of Directive 2001/108/EC is to remove barriers to the cross-border marketing of units of collective investment funds by allowing funds to invest in a wider range of financial instruments (including derivatives), which subject the same regulation in every member state. All UCITS funds must comply with the same investment limits.

A collective investment fund may apply for UCITS status in order to allow EU-wide marketing. The concept is to create a single funds market across the EU. The aim is that with a larger market the economies of scale will reduce costs for investment managers which can be passed on to consumers.

Throughout Europe approximately €6.8 trillion are invested in collective investments. Of these funds about 76% were UCITS as of 2008.

=== UCITS IV ===
The proposal of UCITS IV Directive was approved by the European Parliament on 13 January 2009 and also by the Council of the European Union as Directive 2009/65/EC, to be implemented on 1 July 2011. This updated the UCITS III Directives by introducing the following changes:

- Notification Procedure
- Key Investor Information Document
- Adapted Framework for Mergers
- Master-feeder Structures
- Cooperation between Member State Supervisory Authorities
- Management Company Passport

=== UCITS V ===
On 23 July 2014 the European Union adopted Directive 2014/91/EU ("UCITS V") on the co-ordination of laws, regulations and administrative provisions relating to undertakings for collective investment in transferable securities as regards depositary functions, remuneration policies and sanctions.

UCITS V can be compared with the Alternative Investment Fund Managers Directive ("AIFMD") (European Union Directive 2011/61/EU), which is a parallel regulation for hedge funds and alternative investments.

UCITS V introduces new rules on UCITS depositaries, such as the entities eligible to assume this role, their tasks, delegation arrangements and the depositaries’ liability as well as general remuneration principles that apply to fund managers.

The depositary as a specific function under UCITS legislation (rather as it does under AIFMD). The depositary may delegate its safekeeping functions (but not other depositary functions to a third party custodian.

UCITS V directive requires a Key Investor Information Document or KIID is produced for investors.

Luxembourg transposed the UCITS V directive with the law of 10 May 2016 applied since 1 June 2016. This law of 10 May 2016 amended the Luxembourg law of 17 December 2010 on undertakings for collective investment, as amended (the "2010 Law"), in particular, Parts I, IV and V of the 2010 Law.

=== UCITS VI ===
The proposals concern areas other than those addressed by UCITS V. In summary, these are the topics raised

1. eligible assets and the use of derivatives whether it is necessary to limit the scope of eligible derivatives of those traded on multilateral platforms and cleared by a central counterparty.
2. efficient portfolio management techniques whether the current criteria (on eligibility, liquidity and diversification for example) requires amendment.
3. over-the-counter derivatives ('OTC') how OTC derivative transactions should be dealt with when assessing UCITS limits on counterparty.
4. extraordinary liquidity management rules whether there is a need for a common framework for dealing with liquidity bottlenecks in exceptional cases or otherwise.
5. depositary passport whether a depositary passport should be introduced and how this would work in practice;
6. money market funds =1 whether they present a source of systemic risk and/or do they need harmonised regulation at EU level.
7. long-term investments (a) how access can be afforded to retail investors and how this could be implemented and regulated; (b) what proportion of a fund's portfolio should be dedicated to such assets; and (c) whether diversification rules are necessary to secure adequate liquidity.
8. improvements to the UCITS IV framework for example Article 64(1) of the UCITS Directive requires UCITS to provide information to investors in the following two cases: (i) where an ordinary UCITS converts into a feeder UCITS; and (ii) where a master UCITS changes. As it stands, this does not cover a third possible scenario, namely where a feeder UCITS converts into an ordinary UCITS. Such conversions may lead to a significant change in the investment strategy.

== Provisions ==
- Ch I: Subject matter, scope and definitions
- Ch II: Authorisation of UCITS
- Ch III: Obligations regarding management companies
  - Sect. 1, Conditions for taking up business;
  - Sect. 2, Relations with third countries;
  - Sect. 3, Operating conditions
  - Sect. 4, Freedom of establishment and freedom to provide services
- Ch.IV: Obligations regarding the depositary
- Ch.V, Obligations regarding investment companies
  - Sect.1, Conditions for taking up business;
- Sect.2, Operating conditions;
  - Sect.3, Obligations regarding the depositary
- Ch.VI, Mergers of UCITS
  - Sect.1, Principle, authorisation and approval;
  - Sect.2, Third party control, information of unit holders and other rights of unit holders;
  - Sect.3, Costs and entry into effect
- Ch.VII: Obligations concerning the investment policies of UCITS
- Ch.VIII: Master Feeder Structures
  - Sect.1, Scope and approval;
  - Sect.2, Common provisions for feeder UCITS and master UCITS;
  - Sect.3, Depositories and auditors;
  - Sect.4, Compulsory information and marketing communications by the feeder UCITS;
  - Sect.5, Conversion of existing UCITS into feeder UCITS and change of master UCITS;
  - Sect.6, Obligations and competent authorities
- Ch.IX: Obligations concerning information to be provided to investors
  - Sect.1, Publication of a prospectus and periodical reports;
  - Sect.2, Publication of other information;
  - Sect.3, Key investor information
- Ch.X: General obligations of UCITS
- Ch.XI: Special provisions applicable to UCITS which market their units in other member states
- Ch.XII: Provisions concerning the authorities responsible for authorisation and supervision
- Ch.XIII: Delegated acts and powers of execution
- Ch.XI: Derogations, transitional and final provisions

== Asset allocation ==
As of 2019, the 5/10/40 rule states that funds can only invest up to 10% in a single issuer, and that concentrated investments in excess of 5% must not exceed 40% of the total portfolio, with some exceptions.

UCITS III in 2003 allowed funds to invest up to 10% their funds in illiquid investments.

== See also ==
- EU law
- Directive 2011/61/EU
- Directive 2014/65/EU
- European company law
- Fund of funds
- Institutional investor
- Investment Company Act of 1940
- Money market funds
- UK company law and German company law
