= Australian Financial Services Licence =

Financial license

Under Note 11 of The Commonwealth of Australia Constitution Act, The Corporations Act 2001 can be seen as still in effect

Australian Financial Services Licence (AFSL) is a legal licence provided by the Australian Securities and Investments Commission (ASIC) enabling the operation and activities of Australian financial services businesses. It is a legal requirement for any Australian financial service business to obtain an AFSL from the day business operations begin unless provided a limited licence or exemption with special provisions under section 911A(2)(l) of the Corporations Act. The AFSL is issued by ASIC under Chapter 7 (section 911A) of the Corporations Act 2001, in line with its regulatory supervision of the financial services industry. Australian Financial Service Businesses must submit an application to ASIC coupled with supporting documents to be assessed. Licensees are obligated to provide efficient, honest and fair financial services under the conditions of their AFSL and the Corporations Act 2001. Failure to follow and uphold the policies under the AFSL and the Corporations Act 2001 will result in penalties against the business.

Some wholesale charitable investment fundraisers are exempt from the AFSL licensing requirements. By an instrument in 2002, ASIC granted CIFs certain AFSL exemptions, including exemption from the requirement to hold an AFSL, if the only financial products issued were debentures or managed investment schemes.

== Requirement for an AFSL ==
A financial service involves providing financial product advice including recommendations or statement of opinions with intent to influence a person or persons into making a decision related to a particular financial product or class of financial products (s766A of the Corporations Act).

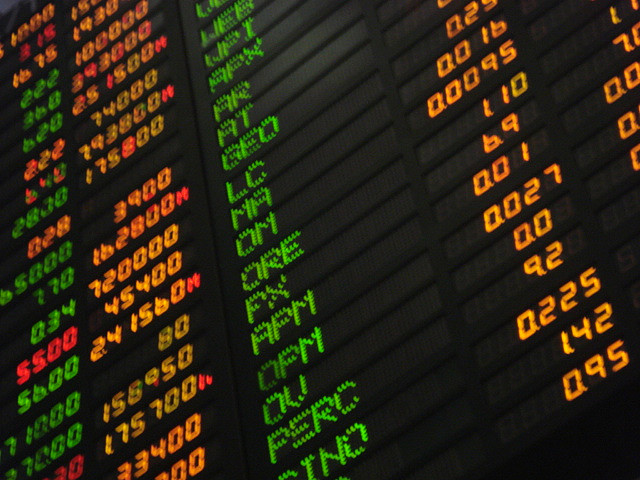
Securities and other financial products are traded on a stock market board as seen above

The AFSL is a legal requirement for any business that:

- "provides or deals with a financial product including securities and interests in managed investment schemes"
- "provides ratings services to financial planners"
- "markets a financial product; and
- operates a registered scheme; and
- provides a custodial or depository service; and
- provides traditional trustee company services"

The AFSL is of particular importance to the accounting sector following the removal of the recognised accountants’ exemption from 1 July 2016. Following statutory changes in 2016, accountants are legally required to hold an AFSL to provide any financial advice, particularly for dealings of self-managed superannuation funds such as the common provision of an investment strategy template. Accountants who deal particularly in areas related to SMSF and superannuation dealings should seek advice on whether they should apply for a limited AFSL or become authorized by another AFSL holder based on their business structure, preferences and risk management.

On the 31st of March 2020, ASIC removed licensing exemptions provided to Foreign Financial Services Providers (FFSPs) that previously allowed them to operate in Australia without an AFSL. FFSPs are now required from 1 April 2020 to apply for an AFSL to provide any financial product or advice given they have registered their business as "a foreign company in Australia under Division 2 of Part 5B.2 of the Corporations Act 2001". Exemptions are currently available for FFSPs who are given leniency in holding an AFSL to conduct financial services in Australia until granted a licence before 31 March 2022 provided they are regulated in a country that ASIC approves including the UK and USA.

Financial service businesses that fail to hold an AFSL face restricted practices which can result in strategic limitations to business growth opportunities along with susceptibility to fines and potential disqualification in comparison to competitors holding an AFSL.

== Process of obtaining and application ==
The financial services industry, is regulated by ASIC who issues an AFSL to applicants under Chapter 7 (section 911A) of the Corporations Act 2001. As part of its mandate, ASIC is required to assess all applications fairly based on whether applicants:

- ‘display the competency required to provide the financial services specified in the application; and
- have ample financial resources to provide on the proposed business services; and
- can meet the other obligations of an AFS licensee (such as training, compliance, insurance and dispute resolution)’

Obtaining an AFSL can easily surpass an amount of $20,000, whereas the ongoing costs, such as annual compliance reviews, range between $8,000 to $25,000 whilst audits average at $10,000. ASIC requires and encourages applicants to complete their application for an AFSL via the eLicensing System available on its website, tailoring questions to the type of business the applicant operates. Tailored paper applications can be requested by applicants in the event that they are unable to apply online via ASIC's eLicensing System. Before applying for an AFSL, applicants must ensure they have read the regulatory guidelines 1–3 under the AFS Licensing kit.

Regulatory guidelines 1–3 of the AFSL provide an overview of the application process, assisting in preparing core supporting documents such as a description of your business and financial resources and any additional documents that may be required in the application process. Applicants should also ensure adequate proof of their business's financial resources are attached including any relevant income or cash flow statements to support their application. ASIC guidelines also regulate that applicants must ensure the information lodged is correct, complete and accurate to uphold the reliability of their application and speed up the assessment process. Once an applicant has compiled all relevant information and has prepared either an AFSL or variation application, they must submit it to ASIC to be assessed whilst additional supporting documentation can now be sent electronically within 20 business days of application to expediate the licensing process. Applicants should be aware of the length of the assessment process to ensure they do not provide unlicensed services. Applicants can expect the assessment process to take as little as 2 weeks if extensive documentation has been provided to support their application, but a longer period will prevail for less substantiated applications and for business with minimal history as ASIC will be required to conduct a thorough investigation. Once successful, applicants will be able to provide financial services and advice under an issued draft licence until ASIC issues a final licence to the business.

Along with key documentation the applicant should ensure they have an appropriate structure including a relevant number of responsible managers depending on the business structure and complexity. This structure will ensure organisational competence and risk management proving to ASIC that the applicant's business has staff with appropriate qualifications and experience to conduct financial services with integrity to consumers. ASIC will then assess the credentials of these responsible managers against 5 of the criteria found in regulatory Guide RG105 including having 3+ years’ experience in service under their licence. Responsible managers must meet at least 1 of the 5 criteria which for ASIC gives them confidence that these managers can undertake day-to-day decisions in financial services, have good character, knowledge, skills and experience and importantly can always enforce organisational competency. If the AFSL application process is unsuccessful, ASIC does allow the applicant an opportunity to argue their case to an informal hearing and should they be formally denied, the applicant must reapply at a later date.

From 8 February 2020, following changes brought up in the Annual Australian Financial System Inquiry, ASIC requires all new applicants and existing AFSL holders and its related staff to cohere to the new "fit and proper person" test to minimise licensee misconduct and prove they can competently provide their services.

== Obligations and requirements of licensees ==
Under the AFSL and Corporations Act 2001, licensees are required to follow set standards, protocols and regulatory guidelines. If at any point in time, a licensee feels they have breached or cannot continue with such obligations, they must contact ASIC. Under the AFSL and Corporations Act 2001 a range of obligations exist requiring licensees:

- To follow financial obligations that are specific to the Business's products and services they offer including adequate availability of financial resources to conduct the supervisory arrangements and services listed in their AFSL
- To follow general obligations by ensuring financial services are provided efficiently, honestly and fairly.
- To follow risk obligations by having adequate risk management systems.
- To follow compliance obligations such as complying to conditions outlined under the AFSL and financial services law.
- To follow HR obligations including adequately training representatives to ensure competency when providing financial services.
- To follow conflict of interest obligations by having a dispute resolution system that satisfies s912A(2) of the Corporations Act 2001 where financial services are provided to retail clients.

ASIC imposes legal requirements addressing each specific obligation to ensure licensees adhere to them such as financial requirements including solvency, net assets and audit requirements to ensure maintenance of sufficient financial resources to undertake daily financial services and to ultimately conduct activities in an ethical manner. If licensees fail to undertake the responsibilities under their obligations such as failing to report breaches or upholding a suffice dispute management program ASIC may be required to cancel the business's licence.

AFS licensees must ensure they update information on their Financial Advisers Register with ASIC within 30 days allowing consumers to research into the licensee and therefore protect them against potential unfair business practices. Licensees are required to update the info on ASIC's website when:

- Hiring new financial advisers or an existing financial adviser is no longer part of business operations
- "Details of employed financial advisers have changed including specifics like names, qualifications and financial products they can advise on".

AFS licensees are also obliged to be aware of the changing circumstances within their business. In certain situations, licensees may be required to contact ASIC to vary their licence to the new situations they face, suspend their licence temporarily or even terminate their licence completely. Licensees are required to contact ASIC to vary their licence when they wish to change conditions or provide new services not covered by the scope of their existing licence. The process however is like applying for a new licence and can be lengthy. If licensees feel their services will not comply with current legal obligations or a responsible manager is unavailable to provide services for some period of time, then the business must request a temporal suspension to ensure they do not breach laws and incur fines. Licensees may also request a permanent removal of their licence if they no longer intend on providing financial services that are required to be covered by their licence.

== Legal implications ==
ASIC is able to impose fines and penalties on those businesses that breach their licence, fail to report breaches or dealing in financial services without holding a licence. ASIC emphasizes compliance under the AFSL and Corporations Act 2001 to protect consumers against harmful practices and uphold the confidence and integrity of the financial service industry. Failure to continually show organizational competence and the required process to do may result in ASIC cancelling the AFS business licence. In the scenario where a licensee enters liquidation and appoints external administration, ASIC is required to cancel or temporarily suspend the business's licence to provide financial services as part of its authoritative role in the Corporations Act 2001.

Licensees must ensure that their company is not seen to mislead consumers that "ASIC endorsers their licence and products", as well as ensuring that no affiliation with ASIC is implied which is a requirement to avoid penalties. ASIC enforces these legal implications as it cannot guarantee a licensee company will follow its obligations and importantly investment always has some risk regardless of the company managing the funds. Licensees must always ensure they only deal the services issued in their licence, as varying the services offered without requesting a variation in their licence can lead to fines and removal of licence.

ASIC can punish businesses who deal without a licence with fines up to $22,000 and maximum imprisonment of 2 years. Along with fines and imprisonment, businesses will be susceptible to enforcement action including banning orders if they fail to obtain a licence or comply with ASIC standards under the Corporations Act 2001.

== Consumer help ==
ASIC will protect consumers should a licensee provide services in an unlawful and unethical manner. For example, following the removal of the Australian Accountant's exemption in 2016, accountants who continued to operate without an appropriate AFSL were at risk being sued should a client suffer damages as a result of the unlicensed accountant's advice. If an AFS business such as an accountant were to be unlicensed, it is still prudent that they should still provide assistance to the consumers by recommending that they obtain advice from a financial adviser who is licensed and qualified to do so.

Any client interaction with an AFS Licensee, requires the provision of a Financial Services Guide to assist the client before any financial product advice is provided by the licensee. A valuation report should also be given, detailing that the financial advisor or company holds a valid AFSL to ensure consumer confidence is upheld. Before interacting with a financial services firm, consumers should ensure they consult ASIC's Professional Register to verify that the company that they wish to engage with holds an AFSL thus ensuring competency in service provision. As a further precaution, consumers should examine Money Smart's and ASIC's Financial Advisers Register to verify financial advisers are "an Australian financial services (AFS) licensee, an authorized representative, employee or director of an AFS licensee, or an employee or director of a related body corporate of an AFS licensee". Consumers however should always proceed with caution and acknowledge that a licensee has been provided a licence, but this does not guarantee financial returns or that company's ability to ethical and quality services.
