= Open-ended investment company =

Type of open-ended collective investment in the United Kingdom

An open-ended investment company (OEIC, pron. /ɔɪk/) or investment company with variable capital (ICVC) is a type of open-ended collective investment formed as a corporation under the Open-Ended Investment Company Regulations 2001 in the United Kingdom. The terms "OEIC" and "ICVC" are used interchangeably with different investment managers favouring one over the other. In the UK OEICs are the preferred legal form for new open-ended investment over the older unit trust.

As an open-ended company the manager must create shares when money is invested and redeem shares as requested by shareholders. As with other collective investments, the main function of OEICs is to make money for their shareholders. This is achieved via investing in different asset classes such as equities, fixed-interest investments, and property. By using economies of scale they facilitate access to professional investment management for small investors.

OEICs were developed to be similar to European SICAVs and U.S. mutual funds.

== History ==
While historically, unit trusts were favoured legal vehicles for investment, in the 1990s it was felt that the UK government should allow a corporate form that could repurchase its own shares without the standard restrictions in the Companies Act. The Open-Ended Investment Companies (Investment Companies with Variable Capital) Regulations 1996 first introduced the OEIC, on 11 November 1996 which came into force on 6 January 1997. They were enacted under the European Communities Act 1972 section 2(1) and were therefore known as the "ECA Regulations". The Securities and Investment Board (predecessor to the FCA) regulations, the Financial Services (Open-Ended Investment Companies) Regulations 1997 were approved by the SIB Board on 16 January 1997 and came into effect as from that date. The first commercial OEIC was launched by Threadneedle Asset Management in 1997.

These regulations only allow investment in transferable securities (e.g., listed securities, other collective investment schemes, or certificates of deposit). This ensured that OEICs fell within the scope of the Undertakings for Collective Investment in Transferable Securities Directives (UCITS).

With the advent of a single regulator, the FSA, the previous regulations were replaced by the Open-Ended Investment Companies Regulations 2001 under the Financial Services and Markets Act 2000 section 262. These changes brought the formation of OEICs under control of the FSA and removed the automatic inclusion of an ICVC under the UCITS directive allowing scope for non-UCITS investments (e.g., money market funds, property funds and funds of funds). The changes ensure a level playing field for unit trusts and OEICs.

The FSA was split into two during 2013 and the FSA became the Financial Conduct Authority (FCA) for small and medium-sized firms with the Bank of England taking on responsibility for larger firms with systemic impact.

== Legal structure ==
- A board of directors usually headed by the authorised corporate director (ACD) – An ACD is a FCA authorised firm that assumes full control of the board. The board's responsibilities include: dealing with the day-to-day operation of the company, managing the company's investments, buying and selling the OEIC's shares on demand, and ensuring accurate pricing of shares at net asset value.
- Depositary – The depositary is a firm (usually a bank) authorised by the FCA, independent of the OEIC and of the directors of the OEIC. The depositary holds legal title to the OEIC's investments and is responsible for their safe custody. The depositary can appoint sub-custodians to take custody of the assets but will remain ultimately responsible. The depositary has responsibility for taking reasonable care to ensure the ACD complies with the key regulatory requirements.
- The shareholders have the rights to the OEIC's assets.

== Umbrella fund ==
An OEIC can act as an umbrella scheme holding various sub-funds each with their own investment goals. For example, one OEIC may hold a subfund investing called UK smaller companies and another subfund called UK equity income. Each subfund has its own investment aims and is held separately from other subfunds within the same OEIC. This has some cost savings for the investment manager.

== Open-endedness ==
OEICs are open-ended; the fund is equitably divided into shares which vary in price in direct proportion to the variation in value of the fund's net asset value. Each time money is invested new shares are created to match the prevailing share price; each time shares are redeemed the assets sold match the prevailing share price. In this way there is no supply or demand created for shares and they remain a direct reflection of the underlying assets. OEICs may be single-priced (there is one price at which shares may be bought or sold) or dual-priced, in which case there will be a buying price and a selling price, with the difference between the two being the bid–offer spread.

== See also ==
- Investment trust
- UK company law
