= Investment fund =

Way of investing money alongside other investors

The values and performance of collective funds are listed in newspapers.

An investment fund is a way of investing money alongside other investors in order to benefit from the inherent advantages of working as part of a group such as reducing the risks of the investment by a significant percentage. These advantages include an ability to:

- hire professional investment managers, who may offer better returns and more adequate risk management;
- benefit from economies of scale, i.e., lower transaction costs;
- increase the asset diversification to reduce some unsystematic risk.

It remains unclear whether professional active investment managers can reliably enhance risk adjusted returns by an amount that exceeds fees and expenses of investment management. Terminology varies with country but investment funds are often referred to as investment pools, collective investment vehicles, collective investment schemes, managed funds, or simply funds. In Europe, one regulatory term is undertaking for collective investment in transferable securities, or collective investment undertaking for short (see § Law).

An investment fund may be held by the public, such as a mutual fund, exchange-traded fund, special-purpose acquisition company or closed-end fund, or it may be sold only in a private placement, such as a hedge fund or private equity fund. The term also includes specialized vehicles such as collective and common trust funds, which are unique bank-managed funds structured primarily to commingle assets from qualifying pension plans or trusts.

Investment funds are promoted with a wide range of investment aims either targeting specific geographic regions (e.g., emerging markets or developed markets) or specified industry sectors (e.g., technology). Depending on the country, there is normally a bias towards the domestic market due to familiarity, and the lack of currency risk. Funds are often selected on the basis of these specified investment aims, their past investment performance, and other factors such as investment fees.

== History ==
The first (recorded) professionally managed investment funds or collective investment schemes, such as mutual funds, were established in the Dutch Republic. Amsterdam-based businessman Abraham van Ketwich (also known as Adriaan van Ketwich) is often credited as the originator of the world's first mutual fund.

== Law ==
The term collective investment scheme is a legal concept deriving initially from a set of European Union Directives to regulate mutual fund investment and management. The Undertakings for Collective Investment in Transferable Securities Directives 85/611/EEC, as amended by 2001/107/EC and 2001/108/EC (typically known as UCITS for short) created an EU-wide structure, so that funds fulfilling its basic regulations could be marketed in any member state. The basic aim of collective investment scheme regulation is that the financial "products" that are sold to the public are sufficiently transparent, with full disclosure about the nature of the terms.

In the United Kingdom, the primary statute is the Financial Services and Markets Act 2000, where Part XVII, sections 235 to 284 deal with the requirements for a collective investment scheme to operate. It states in section 235 that a collective investment scheme means "any arrangements with respect to property of any description, including money, the purpose or effect of which is to enable persons taking part in the arrangements (whether by becoming owners of the property or any part of it or otherwise) to participate in or receive profits or income arising from the acquisition, holding, management or disposal of the property or sums paid out of such profits or income".

== Structure ==
=== Constitution and terminology ===
Collective investment vehicles may be formed under company law, by legal trust or by statute. The nature of the vehicle and its limitations are often linked to its constitutional nature and the associated tax rules for the type of structure within a given jurisdiction.

Typically there is:

- A fund manager or investment manager who manages the investment decisions.
- A fund administrator who manages the trading, reconciliations, valuation and unit pricing.
- A board of directors or trustees who safeguard the assets and ensure compliance with laws, regulations and rules.
- The shareholders or unitholders who own (or have rights to) the assets and associated income.
- A marketing or distribution company to promote and sell shares/units of the fund.

Please see below for general information on specific forms of vehicles in different jurisdictions.

=== Net asset value ===
The net asset value (NAV) is the value of a vehicle's assets minus the value of its liabilities. The method for calculating this varies between vehicle types and jurisdiction and can be subject to complex regulation.

=== Open-end fund ===
An open-end fund is equitably divided into shares which vary in price in direct proportion to the variation in value of the fund's net asset value. Each time money is invested, new shares or units are created to match the prevailing share price; each time shares are redeemed, the assets sold match the prevailing share price. In this way there is no supply or demand created for shares and they remain a direct reflection of the underlying assets.

=== Closed-end fund ===
A closed-end fund issues a limited number of shares (or units) in an initial public offering (or IPO) or through private placement. If shares are issued through an IPO, they are then traded on a stock exchange. or directly through the fund manager to create a secondary market subject to market forces.

The price that investors receive for their shares may be significantly different from net asset value (NAV); it may be at a "premium" to NAV (i.e., higher than NAV) or, more commonly, at a "discount" to NAV (i.e., lower than NAV).

In the United States, at the end of 2018, there were 506 closed-end mutual funds with combined assets of $0.25 trillion, accounting for 1% of the U.S. industry.

=== Exchange-traded funds ===
Exchange-traded funds (ETFs) combine characteristics of both closed-end funds and open-end funds. They are structured as open-end investment companies or UITs. ETFs are traded throughout the day on a stock exchange. An arbitrage mechanism is used to keep the trading price close to net asset value of the ETF holdings.

At the end of 2018, there were 1,988 ETFs in the United States with combined assets of $3.3 trillion, accounting for 16% of the U.S. industry.

=== Unit investment trusts ===
Unit investment trusts (UITs) are issued to the public only once when they are created. UITs generally have a limited life span, established at creation. Investors can redeem shares directly with the fund at any time (similar to an open-end fund) or wait to redeem them upon the trust's termination. Less commonly, they can sell their shares in the open market.

Unlike other types of mutual funds, unit investment trusts do not have a professional investment manager. Their portfolio of securities is established at the creation of the UIT.

In the United States, at the end of 2018, there were 4,917 UITs with combined assets of less than $0.1 trillion.

=== Gearing and leverage ===
Some collective investment vehicles have the power to borrow money to make further investments; a process known as gearing or leverage. If markets are growing rapidly this can allow the vehicle to take advantage of the growth to a greater extent than if only the subscribed contributions were invested. However this premise only works if the cost of the borrowing is less than the increased growth achieved. If the borrowing costs are more than the growth achieved a net loss is achieved.

This can greatly increase the investment risk of the fund by increased volatility and exposure to increased capital risk.

Gearing was a major contributory factor in the collapse of the split capital investment trust debacle in the UK in 2002.

=== Availability and access ===
Collective investment vehicles vary in availability depending on their intended investor base:

- Public-availability vehicles are available to most investors within the jurisdiction they are offered. Some restrictions on age and size of investment may be imposed.
- Limited-availability vehicles are limited by laws, regulations, and/or rules to experienced and/or sophisticated investors and often have high minimum investment requirements.
- Private-availability vehicles may be limited to family members or whoever set up the fund. They are not publicly traded and may be arranged for tax or estate-planning purposes.

=== Limited duration ===
Some vehicles are designed to have a limited term with enforced redemption of shares or units on a specified date.

=== Unit or share class ===
Many collective investment vehicles split the fund into multiple classes of shares or units. The underlying assets of each class are effectively pooled for the purposes of investment management, but classes typically differ in the fees and expenses paid out of the fund's assets.

These differences are supposed to reflect different costs involved in servicing investors in various classes; for example:

- One class may be sold through a stockbroker or financial adviser with an initial commission (front-end load); such a class might be called retail shares.
- Another class may be sold with no commission (load) direct to the public; such a class is called direct shares.
- Still a third class might have a high minimum investment limit and only be open to financial institutions; such a class is called institutional shares.

In some cases, by aggregating regular investments by many individuals, a retirement plan (such as a 401(k) plan) may qualify to purchase "institutional" shares (and gain the benefit of their typically lower expense ratios) even though no members of the plan would qualify individually.

Some of the fund classes:

- Class A
- Class B
- Class C
- Class D
- Class E
- Class W
- Class Z

== Advantages ==
=== Diversity and risk ===
One of the main advantages of collective investment is the reduction in investment risk (capital risk) by diversification. An investment in a single equity may do well, but it may collapse for investment or other reasons (e.g. Marconi). If your money is invested in such a failed holding, you could lose your capital. By investing in a range of equities (or other securities) the capital risk is reduced.

- The more diversified your capital, the lower the capital risk.

This investment principle is often referred to as spreading risk.

Collective investments by their nature tend to invest in a range of individual securities. However, if the securities are all in a similar type of asset class or market sector then there is a systematic risk that all the shares could be affected by adverse market changes. To avoid this systematic risk investment managers may diversify into different non-perfectly-correlated asset classes. For example, investors might hold their assets in equal parts in equities and fixed income securities.

=== Reduced dealing costs ===
If one investor had to buy a large number of direct investments, the amount this person would be able to invest in each holding is likely to be small. Dealing costs are normally based on the number and size of each transaction, therefore the overall dealing costs would take a large chunk out of the capital (affecting future profits).

=== Reduction or elimination of requirement to spend personal time investing ===
An investor that chooses to use an investment fund as a way to invest his or her money does not need to spend as much personal time making investment decisions, doing investment research, or performing actual trades. Instead, these actions and decisions will be done by one or more fund managers managing the investment fund.

== Disadvantages ==
=== Costs ===
The fund manager managing the investment decisions on behalf of the investors will of course expect remuneration. This is often taken directly from the fund assets as a fixed percentage each year or sometimes a variable (performance based) fee. If the investor managed their own investments, this cost would be avoided.

Often the cost of advice given by a stockbroker or financial adviser is built into the vehicle. Often referred to as commission or load (in the U.S.) this charge may be applied at the start of the plan or as an ongoing percentage of the fund value each year. While this cost will diminish your returns it could be argued that it reflects a separate payment for an advice service rather than a detrimental feature of collective investment vehicles. It is often possible to purchase units or shares directly from the providers without bearing this cost.

=== Lack of choice ===
Although the investor can choose the type of fund to invest in, they have no control over the choice of individual holdings that make up the fund.

=== Loss of owner's rights ===
If the investor holds shares directly, the investor has the right to attend the company's annual general meeting and vote on important matters. However, investors in a collective investment vehicle often have none of the rights connected with individual investments within the fund.

== Style ==
=== Investment aims and benchmarking ===
Each fund has a defined investment goal to describe the remit of the investment manager and to help investors decide if the fund is right for them. The investment aims will typically fall into the broad categories of Income (value) investment or Growth investment. Income or value based investment tends to select stocks with strong income streams, often more established businesses. Growth investing selects stocks that tend to reinvest their income to generate growth. Each strategy has its critics and proponents; some prefer a blend approach using aspects of each.

Funds are often distinguished by asset-based categories such as equity, bonds, property, etc. Also, perhaps most commonly funds are divided by their geographic markets or themes.

Examples

- The largest markets—U.S., Japan, Europe, UK and Far East are often divided into smaller funds e.g. US large caps, Japanese smaller companies, European Growth, UK mid caps etc.
- Themed funds—Technology, Healthcare, Socially responsible funds.

In most instances whatever the investment aim the fund manager will select an appropriate index or combination of indices to measure its performance against; e.g. FTSE 100. This becomes the benchmark to measure success or failure against.

=== Active or passive management ===
The aim of most funds is to make money by investing in assets to obtain a real return (i.e. better than inflation). The philosophy used to manage the fund's investment vary and two opposing views exist.

Active management—Active managers seek to outperform the market as a whole, by selectively holding securities according to an investment strategy. Therefore, they employ dynamic portfolio strategies, buying and selling investments with changing market conditions, based on their belief that particular individual holdings or sections of the market will perform better than others.

Passive management—Passive managers stick to a portfolio strategy determined at outset of the fund and not varied thereafter, aiming to minimize the ongoing costs of maintaining the portfolio. Many passive funds are index funds, which attempt to replicate the performance of a market index by holding securities proportionally to their value in the market as a whole. Another example of passive management is the "buy and hold" method used by many traditional unit investment trusts where the portfolio is fixed from outset.

Additionally, some funds use a hybrid management strategy of enhanced indexing, in which the manager minimizes costs by broadly following a passive indexing strategy, but has the discretion to actively deviate from the index in the hopes of earning modestly higher returns.

An example of active management success

- In 1998 Richard Branson (head of Virgin) publicly bet Nicola Horlick (head of SG Asset Management) that her SG UK Growth fund would not beat the FTSE 100 index, nor his Virgin Index Tracker fund over three years, nor achieve its stated aim to beat the index by 2% each year. He lost and paid £6,000 to charity.

=== Alpha, Beta, R-squared and standard deviation ===
When analysing investment performance, statistical measures are often used to compare 'funds'. These statistical measures are often reduced to a single figure representing an aspect of past performance:

- Alpha represents the fund's return when the benchmark's return is 0. This shows the fund's performance relative to the benchmark and can demonstrate the value added by the fund manager. The higher the 'alpha' the better the manager. Alpha investment strategies tend to favour stock selection methods to achieve growth.
- Beta represents an estimate of how much the fund will move if its benchmark moves by 1 unit. This shows the fund's sensitivity to changes in the market. Beta investment strategies tend to favour asset allocation models to achieve outperformance.
- R-squared is a measure of the association between a fund and its benchmark. Values are between 0 and 1. Perfect correlation is indicated by 1, and 0 indicates no correlation. This measure is useful in determining if the fund manager is adding value in their investment choices or acting as a closet tracker mirroring the market and making little difference. For example, an index fund will have an R-squared with its benchmark index very close to 1, indicating close to perfect correlation (the index fund's fees and tracking error prevent the correlation from ever equalling 1).
- Standard deviation is a measure of volatility of the fund's performance over a period of time. The higher the figure the greater the variability of the fund's performance. High historical volatility may indicate high future volatility, and therefore increased investment risk in a fund.

=== Types of risk ===
Depending on the nature of the investment, the type of 'investment' risk will vary.

A common concern with any investment is that you may lose the money you invest—your capital. This risk is therefore often referred to as capital risk.

If the assets you invest in are held in another currency there is a risk that currency movements alone may affect the value. This is referred to as currency risk.

Many forms of investment may not be readily salable on the open market (e.g. commercial property) or the market has a small capacity and investments may take time to sell. Assets that are easily sold are termed liquid therefore this type of risk is termed liquidity risk.

== Charging structures and fees ==
=== Fee types ===
For an open-end fund, there may be an initial charge levied on the purchase of units or shares this covers dealing costs, and commissions paid to intermediaries or salespeople. Typically this fee is a percentage of the investment. Some vehicles waive the initial charge and apply an exit charge instead. This may be gradually disappearing after a number of years. Closed-end funds traded on an exchange are subject to brokerage commissions, in the same manner as a stock trade.

The vehicle will charge an annual management charge (AMC) to cover the cost of administering the vehicle and remunerating the investment manager. This may be a flat rate based on the value of the assets or a performance related fee based on a predefined target being achieved.

Different unit/share classes may have different combinations of fees/charges.

=== Pricing models ===
Open-ended vehicles are either dual priced or single priced.

Dual priced vehicles have a buying (offer) price and selling (bid) price. The buying price is higher than the selling price, this difference is known as the spread or bid–offer spread. The difference is typically 5% and may be varied by the vehicle's manager to reflect changes in the market; the amount of variation may be limited by the vehicles rules or regulatory rules. The difference between the buying and selling price includes initial charge for entering the fund.

The internal workings of a fund are more complicated than this description suggests. The manager sets a price for creation of units/shares and for cancellation. There is a differential between the cancellation and bid prices, and the creation and offer prices. The additional units are created are place in the managers box for future purchasers. When heavy selling occurs units are liquidated from the managers box to protect the existing investors from the increased dealing costs. Adjusting the bid/offer prices closer to the cancellation/creation prices allows the manager to protect the interest of the existing investors in changing market conditions. Most unit trusts are dual priced.

Single priced vehicles notionally have a single price for units/shares and this price is the same if buying or selling. As single prices vehicle cannot adjust the difference between the buying and selling price to adjust for market conditions, another mechanism, the dilution levy exists. SICAVs, OEICs and U.S. mutual funds are single priced.

A dilution levy can be charged at the discretion of the fund manager, to offset the cost of market transactions resulting from large un-matched buy or sell orders. For example, if the volume of purchases outweigh the volume of sales in a particular trading period the fund manager will have to go to the market to buy more of the assets underlying the fund, incurring a brokerage fee in the process and having an adverse effect on the fund as a whole ("diluting" the fund). The same is the case with large sell orders. A dilution levy is therefore applied where appropriate and paid for by the investor in order that large single transactions do not reduce the value of the fund as a whole.

== Internationally recognised collective investments ==
- Exchange-traded funds (ETFs)—an open-end fund traded by listed shares on major stock exchanges.
- Real Estate Investment Trusts (REITs)—a close-ended fund that invests in real estate.
- Sovereign investment funds

== United States market ==
Investment funds are regulated by the Investment Company Act of 1940, which broadly describes three major types: open-end funds, closed-end funds, and unit investment trusts.

Open-end funds called mutual funds and ETFs are common. As of 2019, the top 5 asset managers accounted for 55% of the 19.3 trillion in mutual fund and ETF investments. However, for active management, the top 5 account for 22% of the market, with the top 10 accounting for 30% and the top 25 accounting for 39%. BlackRock and Vanguard are the top two when including passive investments.

The top 5 active management funds in 2018 were Capital Group Companies (using American Funds brand), Fidelity Investments, Vanguard, T. Rowe Price, and Dimensional Fund Advisors; in 2008, the list included PIMCO and Franklin Templeton.

Closed-end funds are less common, with around $277 billion in assets under management as of 2019, including about $107 billion in equities and $170 billion in bonds; market leaders include Nuveen and BlackRock.

Unit investment trusts are the least common, with about $6.5 billion in assets as of 2019.

== UK-specific collective investments ==
- Exchange-traded funds (ETFs)—Open-ended with a corporate structure.
- Investment Trusts—Introduced 1868. Closed-ended with corporate structure.
- Tax transparent funds—Introduced 2013.
- Open-ended investment companies (OEICs or ICVCs)—Introduced 1997. Open-ended with a corporate structure.
- Unit Trusts—Introduced 1931. Open-ended with a trust structure.
- Unitised Insurance Funds—Introduced 1970s. Open-ended with a life policy structure.
- With-profits policy—Open-ended with a life policy structure.
- Non mainstream pooled investment funds—introduced in 2014. Closed-ended or open-ended.

== Canadian collective investments ==
- Income Trusts
- Labour Sponsored Funds
- Mutual funds

== Ireland specific collective investments ==
- Common contractual fund ("CCF")
- Irish Collective Asset-Management Vehicle (commonly referred to as an "ICAV")
- Qualifying investor alternative investment fund (QIAIF)
- Retail Investor Alternative Investment Fund (RIAIF)
- Loan Originating Alternative Investment Fund (L-QIAIF)

== European collective investments ==
- SICAVs
- UCITS

=== France and Luxembourg ===
- FCP (Fonds commun de placement) (unincorporated investment fund or common fund)
- SICAF (Société d'investissement à capital fixe) (Investment company with fixed capital)
- SICAV (Société d'investissement à capital variable) (Investment company with variable capital)

=== Netherlands and Belgium ===
- BEVAK (Investment company with fixed capital)
- BEVEK (Investment Company with variable capital)
- PRIVAK (Closed-end investment company)

=== Poland ===
Investment funds are regulated by Act of 27 May 2004 r. on investment funds and management of alternative investment funds. Each investment fund is managed by a company that is an Investment Fund Association (Towarzystwo Funduszy Inwestycyjnych) and may operate as:

- an open-ended investment fund (Fundusz Inwestycyjny Otwarty);
- an alternative investment fund: a specialized open-ended investment fund (Specjalistyczny Fundusz Inwestycyjny Otwarty) or a closed-ended investment fund (Fundusz Inwestycyjny Zamknięty).

A separate form of collective investment in Poland is Alternative Investment Company (Alternatywna Spółka Inwestycyjna) managed by companies with the status of Alternative Investment Company Manager (Zarządzający Alternatywną Spółką Inwestycyjną). The supervision and oversight are primarily handled by the Polish Financial Supervision Authority, which ensures the proper functioning of the financial markets and the protection of investors.

=== Ukraine ===
- Instytut spilnogo investuvannya, ISI (Investment Funds)
- Private investment fund (Payovyi investytsiyny fond)
- Public investment fund (Korporatyvny investytsiyny fund)

Both funds are run by Investment Company (KUA - kompania z upravlinnya actyvami). Funds and companies regulated and supervised by DKTsPFR (Securities and stock market state commission)

=== Greece ===
We could say that a mutual fund is a pool of money which belongs to many investors. Otherwise a M/F is the common cashier of many investors who trust a third party to operate and manage their wealth. Moreover, they order this third party which in Greece is called A.E.D.A.K. (Mutual Fund Management Company S.A.) to spread their money in many different investment products such as shares, bonds, deposits, repo etc. Those companies in Greece may provide services according to article 4 of Law 3283/2004. People who own units (shares) of a mutual fund are called unitholders. In Greece co-unitholders, which are persons participating in the same units of M/F have exactly the same rights as the unitholder (according to the Law for the deposits in common account 5638/1932). The unitholders have to sign and accept the document which describes the purpose of the Mutual Fund, how it operates, and anything concerning the Fund. This document is the regulation of the M/F. The property of each M/F by law have to be under the control of a bank legally operating in Greece (Greek or foreign). The bank is the custodian of the M/F and except of the custody of the fund also controls the lawfulness of all movements of the management company. The Supervisory and Regulatory Body of M.F. Management Companies and Portfolio Investment Companies is the Greek Capital Market Commission. It comes under the jurisdiction of the Ministry of National Economy and controls the operation of all M/Fs available in Greece. All investors have to be very careful and about the risk they undertake. They have to have in mind that all investments have a certain degree of risk. Risk–free investments does not exist.

=== Switzerland ===
- open-ended
  - Anlagefonds (unincorporated investment fund or common fund)
  - SICAV (Société d'investissement à capital variable) (Investment company with variable capital)
- closed-ended
  - Kommanditgesellschaft für Kapitalanlagen (Limited Partnership)
  - Société d'investissement à capital fixe|SICAF (Société d'investissement à capital fixe) (Investment company with fixed capital)

== Australian collective investments ==
- Listed investment company or LIC. Closed-ended collective investment either corporate or trust based. Available since 1928.
- Managed Investment Vehicle per s 9 of the Corporations Act (Cth) 2001.
- Unit trusts open-ended trust based investments often called Managed funds, managed investment vehicles. or unlisted managed funds. If the managed investment vehicle is open for retail investors, the managed investment vehicle must be registered with ASIC. An unregistered vehicle has a Trustee whilst a registered vehicle has a Responsible Entity.

== Offshore collective investments ==
- Segregated portfolio company, a corporate entity for holding various investments under a single legal entity.

== See also ==
- Collective trust fund
- Common fund
- Fund derivative
- Fund governance
- Global assets under management
- Independent financial adviser
- Investment management
- Offshore investment
- Separately managed account
- Specialized investment fund
- Undertakings for Collective Investment in Transferable Securities Directive 2009
