= SICAV =

Collective investment scheme

A SICAV is a collective investment scheme common in Western Europe, especially Luxembourg, Switzerland, Italy, Spain, Belgium, Malta, France, and the Czech Republic. SICAV is an acronym in French for société d'investissement à capital variable, which can be translated as 'investment company with variable capital and securities (government bonds, stocks, corporate bonds)'.

It is similar to an open-ended mutual fund in the United States, while a sociedad de inversión de capital fijo or société d'investissement à capital fixe (SICAF) is similar to a closed-end fund. As in the case of other open-end collective investment schemes (such as contractual funds), the investor is in principle entitled at all times to request the redemption of their units and payment of the redemption amount in cash.

SICAVs are increasingly being cross-border marketed in the EU under the UCITS directive.

== SICAV names in various languages ==
- Czech akciová společnost s proměnným základním kapitálem
- Dutch Beleggingsvennootschap met veranderlijk kapitaal
- German Investmentgesellschaft mit variablem Kapital
- Italian società d'investimento a capitale variabile
- Spanish sociedad de inversión de capital variable

== SICAV/Open-end Collective Investment in Switzerland ==
According to the Swiss Federal Act on Collective Investment Schemes (Collective Investment Schemes Act - CISA), an open-ended collective investment scheme may be in the form of a contractual fund or an investment company with variable capital (SICAV).

With open-ended collective investment schemes, investors have either a direct or indirect legal entitlement, at the expense of the collective assets, to redeem their units at the net asset value.

Each open-ended collective investment scheme has its own fund regulations (often referred to also as prospectus). Contractual funds are regulated by the collective investment contract (e. g., fund contract). In SICAVs, it is the articles of association and the investment regulations.

== SICAVs in Spain ==
In Spain, a SICAV is a public limited company whose object is to invest in financial assets. SICAVs have great tax advantages, paying corporate income tax (corporation tax) at a rate of just 1%. Nonetheless, they have to fulfill several requirements:

- Number of stockholders no fewer than 100.
- Restrictions on investments.
- Capital may vary between the minimum and maximum established by the articles of association.
- Minimum capital of €2,400,000.
- Oversight and supervision is carried out by the Comisión Nacional del Mercado de Valores and the Dirección General del Tesoro y Política Financiera.

In the Basque Country and Navarre, the autonomous regional tax authorities have raised the corporate income tax for SICAVs to that of the rest of corporations (up to 28%). As a result, the Basque and Navarrese SICAVs have changed their sites to the rest of Spain or the European Union.

== See also ==
- Collective investment schemes
- Financial services
- ICVC (the UK equivalent)
- Investment
- Open-end fund (the US equivalent)
