= Net asset value =

Net value of an entity calculated as total value of its assets minus value of liabilities

Net asset value (NAV) is the value of an entity's assets minus the value of its liabilities, often in relation to open-end funds, mutual funds, hedge funds, and venture capital funds. Shares of such funds registered with the U.S. Securities and Exchange Commission are usually bought and redeemed at their net asset value. It is also a key figure with regard to hedge funds and venture capital funds when calculating the value of the underlying investments in these funds by investors. This may also be the same as the book value or the equity value of a business. Net asset value may represent the value of the total equity, or it may be divided by the number of shares outstanding held by investors, thereby representing the net asset value per share. NAV gained momentum in REIT 20 years after enactment of Public Law 86-779, signed by President Dwight D. Eisenhower in 1960. This was as a result of its extensive use by Green Street Advisors in 1985.

== Overview ==
Net asset value and other accounting and recordkeeping activities are the result of the process of fund accounting (also known as securities accounting, investment accounting, and portfolio accounting). Fund accounting systems are sophisticated computerized systems used to account for investor capital flows in and out of a fund, purchases and sales of investments, and related investment income, gains, losses and operating expenses of the fund. The fund's investments and other assets are valued regularly; daily, weekly, or monthly, depending on the fund and associated regulatory or sponsor requirements. There is no universal method or basis of valuing assets and liabilities for the purposes of calculating the net asset value used throughout the world, and the criteria used for the valuation will depend upon the circumstances, the purposes of the valuation, and any regulatory and/or accounting principles that may apply. For example, for U.S.-registered open-ended funds, investments are commonly valued each day the New York Stock Exchange is open, using closing prices (meant to represent fair value), typically 4:00 p.m. Eastern Time. For U.S.-registered money market funds, investments are often carried or valued at "amortized cost" as opposed to market value for expedience and other purposes, provided various requirements are continually met. The Securities and Exchange Board of India issued a notice on 17th September 2020 stating that when purchasing mutual fund units before 1:00 PM the NAV from the day of realization (day when investment money reaches the AMC) will be applicable irrespective of the size of investment.

At the completion of the valuation process and once all other appropriate accounting entries are posted, the accounting books are "closed", enabling a variety of information to be calculated and produced including the net asset value per share.

== Open-ended funds ==
Net asset value is commonly used in the context of open-end funds. Shares and interests in such funds are not traded between investors, but are issued by the fund to each new investor and redeemed by the fund when an investor withdraws. A fund will issue and redeem shares and interests at a price calculated by reference to the NAV of the fund, with the intention that new investors receive a fair proportion of the fund and redeeming investors receive a fair proportion of the fund's value in cash.

For example, if a fund has a NAV of $200 million and 1 million shares in issue on a certain day, the "NAV per share"—the price at which shares are issued—is $200. A person investing $40 million on that day will therefore be given 200,000 shares. Immediately following their investment the total NAV of the fund will be $240 million, as the new investor's cash becomes part of the fund and is available for investment by the fund. The investor will then be entitled to 1/6 of whatever the fund's value is when they withdraw their investment, if in the meantime their 1/6 ownership is not altered by any further withdrawals or investments to the fund.

The valuation of the assets and liabilities of an open-ended fund is therefore very important to investors. If the NAV in the above example had, with the same assets, been calculated as $160 million (and the NAV per share as $160), the investor would have been given 250,000 shares and would become entitled to 1/5 of the fund's value.

In contrast, closed-end funds are traded in the open market between investors, bought and sold at market prices and not based on NAV. So the price of shares or interests in a closed-end fund will be whatever the parties agree it to be, which may not correspond to the fund's NAV. Publicly traded shares in such funds generally trade at a price below NAV.

== Mismarking ==
Mismarking in securities valuation takes place when the value that is assigned to securities does not reflect what the securities are actually worth, due to intentional fraudulent mispricing. Mismarking misleads investors and fund executives about how much the securities in a securities portfolio managed by a trader are worth (the securities' net asset value) and thus misrepresents performance. When a rogue trader engages in mismarking, it allows them to obtain a higher bonus from the financial firm for which they work, where their bonus is calculated by the performance of the securities portfolio that they are managing.

== Valuation of assets in open-ended funds and hedge funds ==
The NAV of a collective investment scheme (such as a U.S. mutual fund or a hedge fund) is calculated by reference to the total value of the fund's portfolio (its assets) less its accrued liabilities (money owed to lending banks, fees owed to investment managers and service providers, and other liabilities).

Calculation of the net asset value for a hedge fund, including the calculation of the fund's income and expense accruals and the pricing of securities at current market value, is a core fund administrator task, because it is the price at which investors buy and sell shares in the fund. The accurate and timely calculation of NAV by the administrator is vital.

In 2003, investors in Lancer Group sued hedge fund administrator Citco for allegedly knowingly disseminating "misleading" Net Asset Value (NAV) statements. Citco ultimately informed investors that it was resigning as administrator to Lancer's funds, but did not provide an explanation. While Citco pointed to the fact that it had sought statements from Lancer's board of directors as to the propriety of the valuations, Southern District of NY Judge Shira Scheindlin wrote: "Although these actions demonstrate Citco Group's questioning of the numbers, they could also be interpreted as Citco Group's efforts to shield its own involvement in the process". Ultimately, Citco settled with investors.

The case of Anwar v. Fairfield Greenwich (SDNY) is the major case relating to fund administrator liability for failure to handle its NAV-related obligations properly. The defendants settled in 2016 by paying the Anwar plaintiffs $235 million. The court held in the case, prior to the settlement, that "it is reasonable to infer from Plaintiffs' allegations that the Administrators were aware that Plaintiffs would—and did—rely on their statements of the Funds' NAVs that were sent to the investors.... Accordingly, the Court finds that Plaintiffs allege a relationship between the investors and the Administrators that gives rise to a duty of care ...."

== Businesses ==
Turning to operating companies as opposed to investment companies (mutual funds), in determining whether shares in a public company are a cheap or expensive investment, one tool used by investors is a comparison of the company's current market capitalization (being the price at which the market values the company) with its NAV. The NAV may be below the market price for the following reasons:

- Accounting principles and bases of presentation of amounts in financial statements differ worldwide, blurring the comparability of companies in various jurisdictions. Financial statement values are typically recorded based on their local jurisdiction's related principles of accounting, which affect all the remaining points below.
- The current value of a company's assets likely differ from the historical cost reflected in the financial statements used in NAV calculations.
- The NAV describes the company's current asset and liability position. Investors might believe that the company has significant growth prospects, in which case they would be prepared to pay more for the company than its NAV.
- Certain assets, such as goodwill (which broadly represents a company's ability to make future profits), are not necessarily included on a balance sheet and so will not appear in an NAV calculation.

A company's market value will not always be greater than its NAV. For example, analysts and management estimated that Liberty Media Corporation was trading for 30–50% below its net asset value (or "core asset value") in June 2007. Where a company's market value is lower than its NAV, it may be considered more profitable to wind the company down and sell off its assets individually rather than continue to run it as a going concern.

In contrast to fund valuation, the assets of a company will generally be valued for the purpose of a NAV calculation using the book value, the historical cost, or the amortised cost of the company's assets, or an appropriate combination of the three.

== Real estate investment trusts ==
NAV is one of the valuation indices of real estate investment trusts (REITs, pronounced "Reets"). NAV is normally quoted "per investment unit" where the value is divided by the number of total outstanding investment units. In simple terms, NAV is an adjusted net asset value reflecting the market values of real estate properties held by an investment corporation. The degree of premium/discount on individual investment unit prices relative to the per-unit NAV serves as the yardstick for assessment. The NAV index is synonymous to the adjusted price-to-book ratio in which factors such as unrealized losses/gains of owned properties and brand values are reflected. News companies such as PropertyMall typically report on a REIT's NAV when the company reports it.

== Variable insurance and variable annuity contracts ==
Variable universal life insurance policies and variable annuity contracts often are structured somewhat similarly to mutual funds, and they may vary in value as securities and markets fluctuate. Typically, these insurance or annuity products issue "units" of ownership to policyholders/annuitants in exchange for their investment—similar to shares of a mutual fund. Also similar to a fund, the assets, liabilities, and net assets of these product entities are valued periodically, resulting in an asset unit value or AUV or UAV per share, which is similar to NAV for a fund.

== See also ==
- Net assets
- Assets under management
