= List of American exchange-traded funds =

This is a table of notable American exchange-traded funds, or ETFs. As of 2020, the number of exchange-traded funds worldwide was over 7,600, representing about 7.74 trillion U.S. dollars in assets. The largest ETF, as of April 2021, was the SPDR S&P 500 ETF Trust (NYSE Arca: SPY), with about $353.4 billion in assets. The second-largest was the iShares Core S&P 500 ETF with around $270.0 billion (NYSE Arca: IVV), and third-largest was the Vanguard Total Stock Market ETF (NYSE Arca: VTI) with $213.1 billion.

== Stock ETFs ==
=== Broad market ETFs ===
- iShares Core S&P Total US Stock Mkt (NYSE Arca: ITOT)
- iShares MSCI ACWI Index (Nasdaq: ACWI)
- iShares Russell 3000 Index (NYSE Arca: IWV)
- Schwab US Broad Market ETF (NYSE Arca: SCHB)
- Schwab Fundamental U.S. Broad Market Index ETF (NYSE Arca: FNDB)
- Vanguard Total World Stock (NYSE Arca: VT), tracks the FTSE All-World Index
- Vanguard Total Stock Market (NYSE Arca: VTI), tracks the MSCI US Broad Market Index
- Vanguard Total International Stock (NYSE Arca: VXUS), tracks the MSCI All Country World ex-USA Investable Market Index
- Vanguard Russell 3000 (NYSE Arca: VTHR), tracks 98% of the US market

=== Index-tracking ETFs ===
- DIAMONDS Trust, Series 1 (NYSE Arca DIA), tracks the Dow Jones Industrial Average
- Guggenheim S&P 500 Equal Weight (NYSE Arca RSP)
- iShares S&P Global 100 Index (NYSE Arca IOO), tracks the S&P Global 100
- iShares S&P 500 Index (NYSE Arca IVV), tracks the S&P 500
- SPDR S&P 500 (NYSE Arca SPY), tracks the S&P 500
- Vanguard S&P 500 (NYSE Arca VOO)
- iShares Russell 2000 Index (NYSE Arca IWM), tracks the Russell 2000
- iShares S&P 100 Index (NYSE Arca OEF), tracks the S&P 100
- PowerShares QQQ ("cubes") (NASDAQ|QQQ), tracks the NASDAQ-100

=== Style ETFs ===
==== Large-cap ETFs ====
- Guggenheim Multi-Asset Income (NYSE Arca CVY)
- Guggenheim S&P 500 Pure Growth ETF (NYSE Arca RPG)
- Guggenheim S&P 500 Pure Value ETF (NYSE Arca RPV)
- iShares Russell 1000 Index (NYSE Arca IWB)
  - iShares Russell 1000 Growth Index (NYSE Arca IWF)
  - iShares Russell 1000 Value Index (NYSE Arca IWD)
- iShares S&P 500 Index (NYSE Arca IVV)
  - iShares S&P 500 Growth Index (NYSE Arca IVW)
  - iShares S&P 500 Value Index (NYSE Arca IVE)
- PowerShares Buyback Achievers (NYSE Arca PKW)
- PowerShares FTSE RAFI US 1000 (NYSE Arca PRF)
- PowerShares S&P 500 Low Volatility (NYSE Arca SPLV)
- Schwab US Large-Cap ETF (NYSE Arca SCHX)
  - Schwab US Large-Cap Growth ETF (NYSE Arca SCHG)
  - Schwab US Large-Cap Value ETF (NYSE Arca SCHV)
- Schwab US Dividend Equity ETF (NYSE Arca SCHD)
- Schwab Fundamental U.S. Large Company Index ETF (NYSE Arca FNDX)
- SPDR S&P Dividend ETF (NYSE Arca SDY)
- Vanguard S&P 500 (NYSE Arca VOO)
  - Vanguard S&P 500 Growth (NYSE Arca VOOG)
  - Vanguard S&P 500 Value (NYSE Arca VOOV)
- Vanguard Large-Cap (NYSE Arca VV)
  - Vanguard Growth (NYSE Arca VUG)
  - Vanguard Value (NYSE Arca VTV)
- Vanguard Mega-Cap 300 (NYSE Arca MGC)
  - Vanguard Mega-Cap 300 Growth (NYSE Arca MGK)
  - Vanguard Mega-Cap 300 Value (NYSE Arca MGV)
- Vanguard Russell 1000 (NYSE Arca VONE)
  - Vanguard Russell 1000 Growth (NYSE Arca VONG)
  - Vanguard Russell 1000 Value (NYSE Arca VONV)
- Vanguard Dividend Appreciation (NYSE Arca VIG)
- Vanguard High Dividend Yield (NYSE Arca VYM)
- WisdomTree Dividend ex-Financials (NYSE Arca DTN)
- WisdomTree LargeCap Dividend (NYSE Arca DLN)

==== Mid-cap ETFs ====
- MidCap 400 SPDR (NYSE Arca MDY)
- iShares Select Dividend (NYSE Arca DVY)
- iShares Russell Midcap Index (NYSE Arca IWR)
  - iShares Russell Midcap Growth Index (NYSE Arca IWP)
  - iShares Russell Midcap Value Index (NYSE Arca IWS)
- iShares S&P MidCap 400 Index (NYSE Arca IJH)
  - iShares S&P MidCap 400 Growth Index (NYSE Arca IJK)
  - iShares S&P MidCap 400 Value Index (NYSE Arca IJJ)
- PowerShares DWA Mom Port (NYSE Arca PDP)
- Schwab US Mid-Cap (NYSE Arca SCHM)
- Vanguard S&P Mid-Cap 400 (NYSE Arca IVOO)
  - Vanguard S&P Mid-Cap 400 Growth (NYSE Arca IVOG)
  - Vanguard S&P Mid-Cap 400 Value (NYSE Arca IVOV)
- Vanguard Mid-Cap (NYSE Arca VO)
  - Vanguard Mid-Cap Growth (NYSE Arca VOT)
  - Vanguard Mid-Cap Value (NYSE Arca VOE)
- Vanguard Extended Market (NYSE Arca VXF), tracks the S&P Completion Index, i.e., S&P Total Market Index minus the S&P 500 Index
- WisdomTree MidCap Dividend ETF (NYSE Arca DON)

==== Small-cap ETFs ====
- iShares Micro-Cap (NYSE Arca IWC)
- iShares Russell 2000 Index (NYSE Arca IWM)
  - iShares Russell 2000 Growth Index (NYSE Arca IWO)
  - iShares Russell 2000 Value Index (NYSE Arca IWN)
- iShares S&P SmallCap 600 Index (NYSE Arca IJR)
  - iShares S&P SmallCap 600 Growth Index (NYSE Arca IJT)
  - iShares S&P SmallCap 600 Value Index (NYSE Arca IJS)
- Schwab US Small-Cap ETF (NYSE Arca SCHA)
- Schwab Fundamental U.S. Small Company Index ETF (NYSE Arca FNDA)
- Vanguard S&P Small-Cap 600 (NYSE Arca VIOO)
  - Vanguard S&P Small-Cap 600 Growth (NYSE Arca VIOG)
  - Vanguard S&P Small-Cap 600 Value (NYSE Arca VIOV)
- Vanguard Small-Cap (NYSE Arca VB)
  - Vanguard Small-Cap Growth (NYSE Arca VBK)
  - Vanguard Small-Cap Value (NYSE Arca VBR)
- Vanguard Russell 2000 (NYSE Arca VTWO)
  - Vanguard Russell 2000 Growth (NYSE Arca VTWG)
  - Vanguard Russell 2000 Value (NYSE Arca VTWV)

=== International ETFs ===
==== Broad ex-US ETFs ====
("ex-US" excludes the United States)

- Claymore/BNY BRIC (NYSE Arca EEB)
- EGShares Emerging Markets Consumer (NYSE Arca ECON)
- iShares International Select Div (NYSE Arca IDV)
- iShares MSCI ACWI ex US Index (NASDAQ|ACWX)
- iShares MSCI BRIC Index (NYSE Arca BKF)
- iShares MSCI EAFE Index (NYSE Arca EFA)
  - iShares MSCI EAFE Growth Index (NYSE Arca EFG)
  - iShares MSCI EAFE Value Index (NYSE Arca EFV)
- iShares MSCI EAFE Small-Cap (NYSE Arca SCZ)
- iShares MSCI Emerging Markets Index (NYSE Arca EEM)
- PowerShares Intl Dividend Achievers (NYSE Arca PID)
- Schwab International Small-Cap Equity (NYSE Arca SCHC)
- Schwab Emerging Markets Equity ETF (NYSE Arca SCHE)
- Schwab International Equity ETF (NYSE Arca SCHF)
- Schwab Fundamental International Large Company Index ETF (NYSE Arca FNDF)
- Schwab Fundamental International Small Company Index ETF (NYSE Arca FNDC)
- Schwab Fundamental Emerging Markets Large Company Index ETF (NYSE Arca FNDE)
- SPDR S&P International Dividend (NYSE Arca DWX)
- Vanguard MSCI EAFE (NYSE Arca VEA)
- Vanguard MSCI Emerging Markets (NYSE Arca VWO)
- Vanguard Total International Stock (NYSE Arca VXUS)
- Vanguard FTSE All-World ex-US (NYSE Arca VEU)
- Vanguard FTSE All-World ex-US Small-Cap (NYSE Arca VSS)
- WisdomTree Emerging Markets Equity Inc (NYSE Arca DEM)
- WisdomTree Emerging Mkts SmallCap Div (NYSE Arca DGS)

==== Regional ex-US ETFs ====
("ex-US" excludes the United States)

- iShares MSCI All Country Asia ex Jpn Idx (NASDAQ|AAXJ)
- iShares MSCI EMU Index (NYSE Arca EZU)
- iShares MSCI Pacific ex-Japan (NYSE Arca EPP)
- iShares S&P Europe 350 Index (NYSE Arca IEV)
- iShares S&P Latin America 40 Index (NYSE Arca ILF)
- SPDR EURO STOXX 50 (NYSE Arca FEZ)
- Vanguard MSCI Europe (NYSE Arca VGK)
- Vanguard MSCI Pacific (NYSE Arca VPL)
- WisdomTree Europe Hedged Equity ETF (NYSE Arca HEDJ)
- WisdomTree Europe SmallCap Dividend (NYSE Arca DFE)
- Global X FTSE Andean 40 ETF (NYSE Arca AND)
- Global X FTSE Nordic Region ETF (NYSE Arca GXF)

==== Country ETFs ====
===== Developed ex-US markets =====
("ex-US" excludes the United States)

- iShares MSCI Australia Index (NYSE Arca EWA)
- iShares MSCI Canada Index (NYSE Arca EWC)
- iShares MSCI German Index (NYSE Arca EWG)
- iShares MSCI Israel ETF (NYSE Arca EIS)
- iShares MSCI Italy Capped (NYSE Arca EWI)
- iShares MSCI Japan Index (NYSE Arca EWJ)
- iShares MSCI Korea Index (NYSE Arca EWY)
- iShares MSCI Sweden Index (NYSE Arca EWD)
- iShares MSCI Switzerland Capped (NYSE Arca EWL)
- iShares MSCI Spain Capped (NYSE Arca EWP)
- iShares MSCI United Kingdom Index (NYSE Arca EWU)
- WisdomTree Japan Hedged Equity (NYSE Arca DXJ)
- Global X FTSE Norway 30 ETF (NYSE Arca NORW)

===== Emerging markets =====
- Nifty India Financials ETF (NYSE Arca INDF)
- iShares MSCI Brazil Index (NYSE Arca EWZ)
- iShares FTSE/Xinhua China 25 Index (NYSE Arca FXI)
- iShares MSCI Hong Kong Index (NYSE Arca EWH)
- iShares MSCI Mexico Index (NYSE Arca EWW)
- iShares MSCI Philippines Index (NYSE Arca EPHE)
- Market Vectors Russia ETF (NYSE Arca RSX)
- iShares MSCI Singapore Index (NYSE Arca EWS)
- iShares MSCI Malaysia Index (NYSE Arca EWM)
- iShares MSCI Taiwan Index (NYSE Arca EWT)
- WisdomTree India Earnings ETF (NYSE Arca EPI)
- Global X FTSE Argentina 20 ETF (NYSE Arca ARGT)
- Global X FTSE Colombia 20 ETF (NYSE Arca GXG)
- KraneShares MSCI One Belt One Road ETF (NYSE Arca OBOR)
- KraneShares Emerging Markets Consumer Technology ETF (NYSE Arca KEMQ)
- KraneShares MSCI Emerging Markets ex China Index ETF (NYSE Arca KEMX)
- Vanguard FTSE Emerging Markets ETF (NYSE Arca VWO)
- SPDR Portfolio Emerging Markets ETF (NYSE Arca SPEM)
- Schwab Emerging Markets Equity ETF (NYSE Arca SCHE)

=== Sector ETFs ===
Sector ETFs may track sector-based indexes or simply correspond to a basket of companies thought to be representative of a specific market sector.

==== US domestic sectors ====
Consumer discretionary

- Consumer Discretionary Select Sector SPDR (NYSE Arca XLY)
- iShares Dow Jones US Consumer Services (NYSE Arca IYC)
- iShares US Home Construction (NYSE Arca ITB)
- SPDR S&P Homebuilders ETF (NYSE Arca XHB)
- Vanguard Consumer Discretionary (NYSE Arca VCR)

Consumer staples

- Consumer Staples Select Sector SPDR (NYSE Arca XLP)
- iShares Dow Jones US Consumer Goods (NYSE Arca IYK)
- Vanguard Consumer Staples (NYSE Arca VDC)

Energy

- ALPS Alerian MLP ETF (NYSE Arca AMLP)
- Energy Select Sector SPDR (NYSE Arca XLE)
- iShares Dow Jones US Energy (NYSE Arca IYE)
- iShares North American Natural Resources (NYSE Arca IGE)
- Market Vectors Oil Services ETF (NYSE Arca OIH)
- SPDR S&P Oil & Gas Explor & Prod ETF (NYSE Arca XOP)
- Vanguard Energy (NYSE Arca VDE)
- Clean Edge Green Energy (NASDAQ|QCLN)

Electronic Sports

- Roundhill BITKRAFT Esports & Digital Entertainment ETF (NERD:NYSE Arca NERD)
- VanEck Vectors Video Gaming and eSports ETF (NYSE Arca ESPO)

Financials

- Financial Select Sector SPDR (NYSE Arca XLF)
- iShares Dow Jones US Financial (NYSE Arca IYF)
- SPDR S&P Bank ETF (NYSE Arca KBE)
- SPDR S&P Regional Banking ETF (NYSE Arca KRE)
- Vanguard Financials (NYSE Arca VFH)

Health care

- First Trust Health Care AlphaDEX (NYSE Arca FXH)
- First Trust NYSE Arca Biotech Index (NYSE Arca FBT)
- Health Care Select Sector SPDR (NYSE Arca XLV)
- iShares Dow Jones US Health Care (NYSE Arca IYH)
- iShares Nasdaq Biotechnology (NASDAQ|IBB)
- PowerShares Dynamic Pharmaceuticals (NYSE Arca PJP)
- SPDR S&P Biotech ETF (NYSE Arca XBI)
- Vanguard Health Care (NYSE Arca VHT)

Industrials

- Industrial Select Sector SPDR (NYSE Arca XLI)
- iShares Dow Jones US Industrial (NYSE Arca IYJ)
- Vanguard Industrials (NYSE Arca VIS)

Materials

- Materials Select Sector SPDR (NYSE Arca XLB)
- iShares Dow Jones US Materials (NYSE Arca IYM)
- Market Vectors Gold Miners ETF (NYSE Arca GDX)
- Market Vectors Junior Gold Miners ETF (NYSE Arca GDXJ)
- Vanguard Materials (NYSE Arca VAW)

Information technology

- First Trust Dow Jones Internet Index (NYSE Arca FDN)
- Technology Select Sector SPDR (NYSE Arca XLK)
- iShares Dow Jones US Technology (NYSE Arca IYW)
- iShares North American Tech-Software (NYSE Arca IGV)
- Vanguard Information Technology (NYSE Arca VGT)

Telecommunication

- iShares Dow Jones US Telecommunications (NYSE Arca IYZ)
- Vanguard Telecommunication Services (NYSE Arca VOX)

Utilities

- Utilities Select Sector SPDR (NYSE Arca XLU)
- iShares Dow Jones US Utilities (NYSE Arca IDU)
- Vanguard Utilities (NYSE Arca VPU)

==== Global sectors ====
Consumer discretionary

- SPDR S&P International Consumer Discretionary (NYSE Arca IPD)
- iShares S&P Global Consumer Discretionary (NYSE Arca RXI)

Consumer staples

- SPDR S&P International Consumer Staples (NYSE Arca IPS)
- iShares S&P Global Consumer Staples (NYSE Arca KXI)

Energy

- SPDR S&P International Energy (NYSE Arca IPW)
- iShares S&P Global Energy (NYSE Arca IXC)

Financials

- SPDR S&P International Financial (NYSE Arca IPF)
- iShares S&P Global Financial (NYSE Arca IXG)

Health care

- SPDR S&P International Health Care (NYSE Arca IRY)
- iShares S&P Global Healthcare (NYSE Arca IXJ)

Industrials

- SPDR S&P International Industrial (NYSE Arca IPN)
- iShares S&P Global Industrials (NYSE Arca EXI)

Materials

- FlexShares Mstar Gbl Upstrm Nat Res ETF (NYSE Arca GUNR)
- SPDR S&P International Materials (NYSE Arca IRV)
- iShares S7P Global Materials (NYSE Arca MXI)

Information technology

- SPDR S&P International Technology (NYSE Arca IPK)
- iShares S&P Global Technology (NYSE Arca IXN)

Telecommunication

- SPDR S&P International Telecommunications (NYSE Arca IST)
- iShares S&P Global Telecommunications (NYSE Arca IXP)

Utilities

- SPDR S&P International Utilities (NYSE Arca IPU)
- iShares S&P Global Utilities (NYSE Arca JXI)

== Bond ETFs ==
- AdvisorShares Peritus High Yield ETF (NYSE Arca HYLD)
- FlexShares iBoxx 3Yr Target Dur TIPS ETF (NYSE Arca TDTT)
- iShares 1-3 Year Credit Bond (NYSE Arca CSJ)
- iShares 3-7 Year Treasury Bond (NYSE Arca IEI)
- iShares Core U.S. Aggregate Bond (NYSE Arca AGG)
- iShares Barclays 1-3 Year Treasury Bond (NYSE Arca SHY)
- iShares Barclays TIPS Bond (NYSE Arca TIP)
- iShares iBoxx $ High Yield Corp Bond (NYSE Arca HYG)
- iShares iBoxx $ Invest Grade Corp Bond (NYSE Arca LQD)
- iShares Barclays 7-10 Year Treasury (NYSE Arca IEF)
- iShares Barclays 20+ Year Treas Bond (NYSE Arca TLT)
- iShares Floating Rate Bond (NYSE Arca FLOT)
- iShares Intermediate Credit Bd (NYSE Arca CIU)
- iShares Intm Government/Credit Bond (NYSE Arca GVI)
- iShares JPMorgan USD Emerg Markets Bond (NYSE Arca EMB)
- iShares MBS (NYSE Arca MBB)
- iShares National AMT-Free Muni Bond (NYSE Arca MUB)
- iShares Short Treasury Bond (NYSE Arca SHV)
- Market Vectors High-Yield Muni ETF (NYSE Arca HYD)
- PIMCO 0-5 Year High Yld Corp Bd Idx ETF (NYSE Arca HYS)
- PIMCO 1-5 Year US TIPS Index ETF (NYSE Arca STPZ)
- PIMCO Enhanced Short Maturity ETF (NYSE Arca MINT)
- PIMCO Total Return ETF (NYSE Arca BOND)
- Quadratic Interest Rate Volatility and Inflation Hedge ETF (NYSE Arca IVOL)
- Quadratic Deflation ETF (NYSE Arca BNDD)
- PowerShares Emerging Mkts Sovereign Debt (NYSE Arca PCY)
- PowerShares Senior Loan Port (NYSE Arca BKLN)
- Schwab US Aggregate Bond (NYSE Arca SCHZ)
- Schwab US TIPS (NYSE Arca SCHP)
- Schwab Short-Term US Treasury (NYSE Arca SCHO)
- Schwab Intermediate-Term US Treasury (NYSE Arca SCHR)
- SPDR BarCap ST High Yield Bond ETF (NYSE Arca JNK)
- SPDR Barclays 1-3 Month T-Bill (NYSE Arca BIL)
- SPDR Barclays Capital Convertible Secs (NASDAQ|CWB)
- SPDR Barclays Capital High Yield Bond ETF (NYSE Arca JNK)
- SPDR Barclays Capital Short Term Corp Bd (NYSE Arca SCPB)
- SPDR Barclays International Treasury Bd (NYSE Arca BWX)
- SPDR Barclays Short Term Hi Yld Bd ETF (NYSE Arca SJNK)
- SPDR Nuveen Barclays Capital Muni Bond (NYSE Arca TFI)
- SPDR Nuveen Barclays Capital S/T Muni Bd (NYSE Arca SHM)
- Vanguard Extended Duration Treasury (NYSE Arca EDV)
- Vanguard Intermediate-Term Bond (NYSE Arca BIV)
- Vanguard Intermediate-Term Corporate Bond (NYSE Arca VCIT)
- Vanguard Intermediate-Term Government Bond (NYSE Arca VGIT)
- Vanguard Long-Term Bond (NYSE Arca BLV)
- Vanguard Long-Term Corporate Bond (NYSE Arca VCLT)
- Vanguard Long-Term Government Bond (NYSE Arca VGLT)
- Vanguard Mortgage-Backed Securities (NYSE Arca VMBS)
- Vanguard Short-Term Bond (NYSE Arca BSV)
- Vanguard Short-Term Corporate Bond (NYSE Arca VCSH)
- Vanguard Short-Term Government Bond (NYSE Arca VGSH)
- Vanguard Shrt-Term Infl-Prot Sec Idx ETF (NASDAQ|VTIP)
- Vanguard Total Bond Market (NYSE Arca BND)
- Vanguard Total Intl Bd Idx ETF (NASDAQ|BNDX)

== Commodity ETFs ==
Commodity ETFs, also known as exchange-traded commodities (ETCs), track a commodity index or a specific commodity. This is often via commodity futures. These fall into four general categories, agricultural, which includes livestock and "softs"; energy resources; industrial materials; and precious metals. The most popular precious metals ETFs hold physical stocks of the metal rather than futures.

=== Broad basket ===
- ELEMENTS Rogers International Commodity Index ETN (NYSE Arca RJI)
- iPath Dow Jones-UBS Commodity Idx TR ETN (NYSE Arca DJP)
- iShares S&P GSCI Commodity-Indexed Trust (NYSE Arca GSG)
- PowerShares DB Commodity Idx Trking Fund (NYSE Arca DBC)

=== Agricultural ETFs ===
- ELEMENTS Rogers Agriculture ETN (NYSE Arca RJA)
- iPath Dow Jones-UBS Agriculture ETN (NYSE Arca JJA)
- PowerShares DB Agriculture (NYSE Arca DBA)

=== Energy commodity ETFs ===
- ELEMENTS Rogers Energy ETN (NYSE Arca RJN)
- iPath Dow Jones-UBS Crude Oil ETN (NYSE Arca OIL)
- iPath Dow Jones-UBS Natural Gas ETN (NYSE Arca GAZ)
- United States Natural Gas Fund (NYSE Arca UNG)
- United States Oil Fund (NYSE Arca USO)

=== Industrial commodity ETFs ===
- ELEMENTS Rogers Metal ETN (NYSE Arca RJZ)
- iPath Dow Jones-UBS Industrial Metals ETN (NYSE Arca JJM)
  - iPath Dow Jones-UBS Copper ETN (NYSE Arca JJC)
- PowerShares DB Base Metals (NYSE Arca DBB)

=== Precious metals ETFs ===
Gold

- Aberdeen Standard Gold ETF Trust (NYSE Arca SGOL)
- iShares Gold Trust (NYSE Arca IAU)
- SPDR Gold Shares (NYSE Arca GLD)

Silver

- Aberdeen Standard Physical Silver Shares ETF (NYSE Arca SIVR)
- iShares Silver Trust (NYSE Arca SLV)

Others

- Aberdeen Standard Physical Palladium Shares ETF (NYSE Arca PALL)
- Aberdeen Standard Physical Platinum Shares ETF (NYSE Arca PPLT)

== Real estate ETFs ==
- iShares Cohen & Steers Realty Majors (NYSE Arca ICF)
- iShares Dow Jones Asia Real Estate (NYSE Arca IFAS)
- iShares Dow Jones Europe Real Estate (NYSE Arca IFEU)
- iShares Dow Jones US Real Estate (NYSE Arca IYR)
- iShares Mortgage Real Estate Capped (NYSE Arca REM)
- Schwab US REIT (NYSE Arca SCHH)
- SPDR Dow Jones Global Real Estate (NYSE Arca RWO)
- SPDR Dow Jones Intl Real Estate (NYSE Arca RWX)
- SPDR Dow Jones REIT ETF (NYSE Arca RWR)
- Wilshire US REIT ETF (NYSE Arca WREI)
- Vanguard Real Estate (NYSE Arca VNQ)
- Vanguard Global ex-US Real Estate (NYSE Arca VNQI)

== Leveraged & short ETFs ==
Typically ETFs track an index. Using a combination of options, futures, and swaps some firms have designed ETFs capable of tracking approximately −1x, 2x, −2x, 3x and −3x the daily returns of an index. 3x and −3x ETFs were first released on November 8, 2008 by Direxion Funds. These funds are structured in a sophisticated way, and due to their extreme volatility they may not be appropriate vehicles for the casual investor. (Note that obtaining 2x the daily returns for one year does not imply that one will receive double the annual returns of an index). On August 18, 2009 the U.S. Securities and Exchange Commission issued a warning to investors that leveraged exchange-traded funds could lead to big losses even if the market index or benchmark they track shows a gain.

=== Short ETFs ===
Short ETFs enable investors to profit from declines in an underlying index without directly selling short any securities. Investors who think an index will decline purchase shares of the short ETF that tracks the index, and the shares increase or decrease in value inversely with the index, that is to say that if the value of the underlying index goes down, then the value of the short ETF shares goes up, and vice versa. Some popular short ETFs include:

AdvisorShares

- AdvisorShares Ranger Equity Bear ETF (NYSE Arca HDGE)

ProShares

- ProShares Short Dow 30 (NYSE Arca DOG)
- ProShares Short S&P 500 (NYSE Arca SH)
- ProShares Short S&P MidCap 400 (NYSE Arca MYY)
- ProShares Short S&P SmallCap 600 (NYSE Arca SBB)
- ProShares Short Nasdaq 100 (NYSE Arca PSQ)
- ProShares Short Russell 2000 (NYSE Arca RWM)
- ProShares Short MSCI EAFE (NYSE Arca EFZ)

Tuttle

- Tuttle Capital Short Innovation ETF

=== Leveraged ETFs ===
The following ETFs are good examples of Leveraged ETFs:

- UBS AG FI Enhanced Large Cap Growth 2x ETF (NYSE Arca FBGX) - tracks the Russell 1000 and will provide investors with a cash payment at the scheduled maturity or early redemption based on the 2x leveraged performance of the Russell 1000 Growth Index Total Return.
- Credit Suisse FI Large Cap Growth Enhanced ETF (NYSE Arca FLGE) - FLGE provides 2X levered exposure to the total return of the Russell 1000 Growth Index, with leverage reset at least quarterly.
- Direxion Daily Mid Cap Bull 3x ETF (NYSE Arca MIDU) - tracks 3x the S&P MidCap 400 Index
- Direxion Daily S&P 500 Bull 2x ETF (NYSE Arca SPUU) - tracks 2x the S&P 500 Index
- Direxion Daily S&P 500 Bull 3x ETF (NYSE Arca SPXL) - tracks 3x the S&P 500 Index
- Direxion Energy Bull 3x ETF (NYSE Arca ERX)
- Direxion Financials Bull 3x ETF (NYSE Arca FAS) - tracks XLF or RIFIN
- Direxion Large Cap Bull 3x (NYSE Arca BGU) tracks 3x the Russell 1000 Index
- Direxion Small Cap Bull 3x (NYSE Arca TNA) tracks 3x the Russell 2000 Index
- ProShares Ultra Dow 30 (NYSE Arca DDM) tracks 2x the Dow Jones Industrial Average
- ProShares Ultra NASDAQ-100 (NYSE Arca QLD) tracks 2x the NASDAQ-100 Index
- ProShares Ultra Russell 2000 (NYSE Arca UWM) tracks 2x the Russell 2000 Index
- ProShares Ultra S&P 500 (NYSE Arca SSO) tracks 2x the S&P 500 Index
- ProShares S&P 500 3x (NYSE Arca UPRO) tracks 3x the S&P 500 Index

=== Leveraged short ETFs ===
The following funds are both short and leveraged:

- UltraShort S&P 500 ProShares 2x (NYSE Arca SDS)
- ProShares S&P 500 Direxionshares Bear 3x ETF (NYSE Arca SPXU)
- Direxion Russell 2000 Direxionshares Bear 3x ETF (NYSE Arca TZA)
- UltraPro Short QQQ (NYSE Arca SQQQ)
- UltraShort NASDAQ-100 ProShares 2X (NYSE Arca QID)
- UltraShort Financials ProShares (NYSE Arca SKF)
- UltraShort Russell 2000 ProShares (NYSE Arca TWM)
- UltraShort Dow 30 ProShares (NYSE Arca DXD)
- UltraShort Real Estate ProShares (NYSE Arca SRS)
- UltraShort MidCap 400 ProShares (NYSE Arca MZZ)
- UltraShort Oil & Gas ProShares (NYSE Arca DUG)
- Direxion Large Cap Bear 3x ETF (NYSE Arca BGZ)
- Direxion Energy Bear 3x ETF (NYSE Arca ERY)
- Direxion Financials Bear 3x ETF (NYSE Arca FAZ) - tracks the inverse of XLF or RIFIN

== Asset allocation ==
ETFs can be asset allocation funds, which include different asset classes rather than just one. They are usually, but not exclusively, implemented using a fund-of-funds structure. The most common ones use fixed strategies, which can be described with terms like "aggressive" or "conservative", denoting more in stocks and more in bonds, respectively. Other ones may have a target-date strategy where the allocation changes over time.

An example of such an ETF is the Russell Investments OneFund (NYSE Arca ONEF), which is composed of nine ETFs (Vanguard and iShares ETFs). Another is the AdvisorShares Cambria Global Tactical ETF (NYSE Arca GTAA). A lineup of Target Date ETFs is offered by iShares (e.g., iShares S&P Target Date 2040 Index Fund; NYSE Arca TZV).

== Active ETFs ==
The following ETFs are not index-based but rather actively managed:

AdvisorShares

- AdvisorShares WCM/BNY Mellon Focused Growth ADR ETF (NYSE Arca AADR)
- AdvisorShares Ranger Equity Bear ETF (NYSE Arca HDGE)
- AdvisorShares Sage Core Reserves ETF (NYSE Arca HOLD)
- AdvisorShares Newfleet Multi-Sector Income ETF (NYSE Arca MINC)
- AdvisorShares STAR Global Buy-Write ETF (NYSE Arca VEGA)
- Advisorshares Gerber Kawasaki ETF (NYSE Arca GK)

ALPS

- Riverfront Strategic Income Fund (NYSE Arca RIGS)

Amplify

- Amplify Enhanced Dividend Income ETF (NYSE Arca DIVO)
- Amplify Seymour Cannabis ETF (NYSE Arca CNBS)
- Amplify Transformational Data Sharing ETF (NYSE Arca BLOK)

Ark Invest

- ARK Genomic Revolution Multi-Sector ETF (NYSE Arca ARKG)
- ARK Industrial Innovation ETF (NYSE Arca ARKQ)
- ARK Next Generation Internet ETF (NYSE Arca ARKW)
- ARK Innovation ETF (NYSE Arca ARKK)
- ARK Fintech Innovation ETF (NYSE Arca ARKF)
- ARK Space Exploration & Innovation ETF (NYSE Arca ARKX)

Cambria

- Cambria Shareholder Yield ETF (NYSE Arca SYLD)

ValueShares

- ValueShares U.S. Quantitative Value ETF
- ValueShares International Quantitative Value ETF

MomentumShares

- MomentumShares U.S. Quantitative Momentum ETF
- MomentumShares International Quantitative Momentum ETF

Columbia Management Group

- Columbia Intermediate Municipal Bond ETF (NYSE Arca GMMB)
- Columbia Core Bond ETF (NYSE Arca GMTB)
- Columbia Select Large Cap Value ETF (NYSE Arca GVT)
- Columbia Large Cap Growth ETF (NYSE Arca RPX)
- Columbia Select Large Cap Growth ETF (NYSE Arca RWG)

First Trust

- First Trust North American Energy Infrastructure Fund (NYSE Arca EMLP)
- First Trust Managed Municipal ETF (NYSE Arca FMB)
- First Trust Morningstar Managed Futures Strategy Fund (NYSE Arca FMF)
- First Trust Preferred Securities and Income ETF (NYSE Arca FPE)
- First Trust Global Tactical Commodity Strategy Fund (NYSE Arca FTGS)
- First Trust High Income ETF (NYSE Arca FTHI)
- First Trust Low Beta Income ETF (NYSE Arca FTLB)
- First Trust Senior Loan ETF (NYSE Arca FTSL)
- First Trust Tactical High Yield ETF (NYSE Arca HYLS)

Flexshares

- Flexshares Ready Access Variable Income Fund (NYSE Arca RAVI)

Franklin Templeton Investments

- Franklin Short Duration US Government ETF (NYSE Arca FTSD)

Guggenheim

- Guggenheim Enhanced Short Duration Bond ETF (NYSE Arca GSY)

iShares

- iShares Liquidity Income ETF (NYSE Arca ICSH)
- iShares Enhanced International Large-Cap ETF (NYSE Arca IEIL)
- iShares Enhanced International Small-Cap ETF (NYSE Arca IEIS)
- iShares Short Maturity Bond ETF (NYSE Arca NEAR)

KraneShares

- KraneShares Global Carbon Transformation ETF (NYSE Arca KGHG)
- KraneShares Asia Pacific High Income Bond ETF (NYSE Arca KHYB)

PIMCO ETFs

- PIMCO Total Return ETF (NYSE Arca BOND)
- PIMCO Low Duration ETF (NYSE Arca LDUR)
- PIMCO Enhanced Short Duration ETF (NYSE Arca MINT)
- PIMCO Intermediate Muni Bond Strategy ETF (NYSE Arca MUNI)
- PIMCO Short Term Muni Bond Strategy ETF (NYSE Arca SMMU)

Quadratic Capital Management

- Quadratic Interest Rate Volatility and Inflation Hedge ETF (NYSE Arca IVOL)
- Quadratic Deflation ETF (NYSE Arca BNDD)

Invesco PowerShares

- PowerShares China-A Share Portfolio (NYSE Arca CHNA)
- S&P 500 Downside Hedged Portfolio (NYSE Arca PHDG)
- Active U.S. Real Estate Fund ETF (NYSE Arca PSR)

State Street SPDR

- SPDR SSgA Global Allocation (NYSE Arca GAL)
- SPDR SSgA Income Allocation (NYSE Arca INKM)
- SPDR SSgA Multi-Asset Real Return (NYSE Arca RLY)
- SPDR Blackstone/GSO Senior Loan ETF (NYSE Arca SRLN)
- SPDR SSgA Ultra Short Term Bond ETF (NYSE Arca ULST)

WisdomTree Investments

- WisdomTree Dreyfus Emerging Currency (NYSE Arca CEW)
- WisdomTree Dreyfus Chinese Yuan (NYSE Arca CYB)
- WisdomTree Emerging Markets Local Debts Fund (NYSE Arca ELD)
- WisdomTree Emerging Markets Corporate Bond Fund (NYSE Arca EMCB)
- WisdomTree Bloomberg U.S. Dollar Bullish Fund (NYSE Arca USDU)

== See also ==
- List of Australian exchange-traded funds
- List of Canadian exchange-traded funds
- List of European exchange-traded funds
- List of Hong Kong exchange-traded funds
- List of Indian exchange-traded funds
- List of Indonesian exchange-traded funds
- List of Japanese exchange-traded funds
- List of New Zealand exchange-traded funds
- List of Singaporean exchange-traded funds
- List of South African exchange-traded funds
- List of South Korean exchange-traded funds
- List of Taiwan exchange-traded funds
- List of Turkish exchange-traded funds
