= Working Group on Financial Markets =

Working group within the US federal government

The President's Working Group on Financial Markets, known colloquially as the Plunge Protection Team, or "(PPT)" was created by Executive Order 12631, signed on March 18, 1988, by United States President Ronald Reagan.

As established by the executive order, the Working Group has three purposes and functions:

"(a) Recognizing the goals of enhancing the integrity, efficiency, orderliness, and competitiveness of our Nation's financial markets and maintaining investor confidence, the Working Group shall identify and consider:

(1) the major issues raised by the numerous studies on the events in the financial markets surrounding October 19, 1987, and any of those recommendations that have the potential to achieve the goals noted above; and
(2) the actions, including governmental actions under existing laws and regulations (such as policy coordination and contingency planning), that are appropriate to carry out these recommendations.

(b) The Working Group shall consult, as appropriate, with representatives of the various exchanges, clearinghouses, self-regulatory bodies, and with major market participants to determine private sector solutions wherever possible.
(c) The Working Group shall report to the President initially within 60 days (and periodically thereafter) on its progress and, if appropriate, its views on any recommended legislative changes."

The Working Group consists of:

- The Secretary of the Treasury, or his or her designee (as Chairperson of the Working Group);
- The Chairperson of the Board of Governors of the Federal Reserve System, or his or her designee;
- The Chairperson of the Securities and Exchange Commission, or his or her designee; and
- The Chairperson of the Commodity Futures Trading Commission, or his or her designee.

== Plunge Protection Team ==
"Plunge Protection Team" was originally the headline for an article in The Washington Post on February 23, 1997, and has since been used by some as an informal term to refer to the Working Group. Initially, the term was used to express the opinion that the Working Group was being used to prop up the stock markets during downturns. Financial writers for British newspapers The Observer and The Daily Telegraph, along with U.S. Congressman Ron Paul, writers Kevin Phillips (who claims "no personal firsthand knowledge") and John Crudele, have charged the Working Group with going beyond their legal mandate. Charles Biderman, head of TrimTabs Investment Research, which tracks money flow in the equities market, suspected that following the 2008 financial crisis the Federal Reserve or U.S. government was supporting the stock market. He stated that "If the money to boost stock prices did not come from the traditional players, it had to have come from somewhere else" and "Why not support the stock market as well? Moreover, several officials have suggested the government should support stock prices."

In August 2005, Sprott Asset Management released a report that argued that there is little doubt that the PPT intervened to protect the stock market. However, these articles usually refer to the Working Group using moral suasion to attempt to convince banks to buy stock index futures.

Former Federal Reserve Board member Robert Heller, in the Wall Street Journal, opined that "Instead of flooding the entire economy with liquidity, and thereby increasing the danger of inflation, the Fed could support the stock market directly by buying market averages in the futures market, thereby stabilizing the market as a whole." Author Kevin Phillips wrote in his 2008 book Bad Money that while he had no interest "in becoming a conspiracy investigator", he nevertheless drew the conclusion that "some kind of high-level decision seems to have been reached in Washington to loosely institutionalize a rescue mechanism for the stock market akin to that pursued...to safeguard major U.S. banks from exposure to domestic and foreign loan and currency crises." Phillips infers that the simplest way for the Working Group to intervene in market plunges would be through buying stock market index futures contracts, either in cooperation with major banks or through trading desks at the U.S. Treasury or Federal Reserve.

== See also ==
- Commodity Futures Modernization Act of 2000
- Single Audit
- Government Accountability Office,
- Revenue (bottom line vs. "top line")
- Government-owned corporation
- Budget theory
- Comprehensive income
- Permanent fund
- Public company
- Crony capitalism
- Government Accountability Office investigations of the Department of Defense
- Federal Accountability Act (Canada)
