= List of Hong Kong exchange-traded funds =

This is a list of notable Hong Kong exchange-traded funds, or ETFs.

== Market Ranking ==
Below table shows the Hong Kong ETF issuer ranking by asset under management (AUM) as of Dec 2025. It excludes the dual-listed ETFs and includes Hong Kong domiciled ETFs only.

Company	AUM as of Dec 2025 (HKD billion)
(Hong Kong) Hang Seng Investment Management	182.60
(China) CSOP Asset Management	158.96
(United States) BlackRock	118.83
China Asset Management	53.23
(Korea) Mirae Asset	37.81
(China) Ping An	7.23
(China) CICC HKAM	4.95
(Hong Kong) Value Partners	4.08
(Hong Kong) BOCI-Prudential	3.63
(Hong Kong) Premia Partners	3.46

The largest ETF by AUM is Tracker Fund of Hong Kong.

== Equity ETFs ==
=== Futures Based ===
- 3097.HK Mirae Asset Horizons S&P Crude Oil Futures Enhanced ER ETF - tracks the S&P GSCI Crude Oil Enhanced Index Excess Return
- 3124.HK Samsung HSI Futures ETF - tracks the HSI Futures Index
- 3134.HK Samsung HSI Futures RMB FX ETF - tracks the HSI Futures RMB FX Index
- 3135.HK CSOP WTI Oil Annual Roll December Futures ER ETF - tracks the BofA Merrill Lynch Commodity index eXtra CLA Index (Excess Return)
- 3175.HK Samsung S&P GSCI Crude Oil ER Futures ETF – tracks the S&P GSCI Crude Oil Index (Excess Return)

=== Physical ===
- 2800.HK Tracker Fund of Hong Kong (TraHK) – tracks the Hang Seng Index
- 2801.HK iShares Core MSCI China ETF – tracks the MSCI China Index
- (Delisted 2023-03-22) 2802.HK iShares MSCI Emerging Asia Index ETF – tracks the MSCI EM Asia Index
- (Delisted 2021-10-15) 2805.HK Vanguard FTSE Asia ex Japan Index ETF – tracks the FTSE Asia Pacific ex Japan, Australia and New Zealand Index
- 2809.HK Global X China Clean Energy ETF - tracks Solactive China Clean Energy Index.
- 2817.HK Premia China Treasury and Policy Bank Bond Long Duration ETF - tracks the ICE 10+ Year China Government & Policy Bank Index
- 2822.HK CSOP FTSE China A50 ETF - tracks the FTSE China A50 Index
- (Delisted 2022-02-14) 2824.HK Lippo Select HK & Mainland Property ETF -tracks the Lippo Select HK & Mainland Property Index
- 2825.HK W.I.S.E. - CSI HK 100 Tracker - tracks the CSI HK 100 Index
- 2828.HK Hang Seng H-Share ETF – tracks the Hang Seng China Enterprises Index
- 2832.HK Bosera Bosera Star 50 Index ETF - tracks the Bosera STAR 50 Index ETF
- (Delisted 2022-09-13) 2833.HK Hang Seng HSI ETF – tracks the Hang Seng Index
- 2835.HK Phillip HK Newly Listed Equities Index ETF is an exchange-traded fund incorporated in Hong Kong. The Fund seeks to track the performance of the Solactive Hong Kong Newly Listed Equities Index.
- 2836.HK iShares Core S&P BSE SENSEX India ETF – tracks the BSE Sensitivity Index
- 2838.HK Hang Seng FTSE China 50 Index ETF – tracks the FTSE China 50 Index
- 2839.HK ChinaAMC Global ETF Series - ChinaAMC MSCI China A 50 Connect ETF - tracks the MSCI China A 50 Connect Index
- (Delisted 2016-09-09) 3002.HK Polaris Taiwan Top 50 Tracker Fund – tracks the FTSE TWSE Taiwan 50 Index
- (Delisted 2019-12-31) 3008.HK C-Shares CSI 300 Index ETF - tracks the CSI 300 Index
- 3010.HK iShares Core MSCI Asia ex Japan ETF - tracks the MSCI All CountryAsia ex Japan Index
- 3012.HK AMUNDI Hang Seng HK 35 Index ETF - tracks the AMUNDI Hang Seng HK 35 Index ETF
- 3021.HK Fubon FTSE Taiwan RIC Capped Index ETF - tracks the FTSE Taiwan RIC Capped Index
- 3024.HK W.I.S.E. - SSE 50 China Tracker - tracks the SSE 50 Index
- 3040.HK GLOBAL X MSCI China ETF - tracks the MSCI China Index
- 3041.HK Global X FTSE China Policy Bank Bond ETF - tracks the FTSE China Policy Bank Bond Index
- (Delisted 2021-12-08) 3043.HK db x-trackers MSCI PACIFIC EX JAPAN INDEX UCITS ETF (DR) - tracks the MSCI Pacific ex Japan TRN Index
- (Delisted 2020-10-27) 3046.HK Value China ETF - tracks the FTSE Value-Stocks China Index
- (Delisted 2021-12-08) 3048.HK db x-trackers MSCI BRAZIL INDEX UCITS ETF (DR) - tracks the MSCI Total Return Net Brazil Index
- 3056.HK Pando Innovation ETF -
- 3060.HK CICC Carbon Futures ETF – closely correspond to the performance of the ICE EUA Carbon Futures Index (Excess Return)
- 3067.HK iShares Hang Seng TECH ETF – tracks the Hang Seng TECH Index
- 3070.HK Ping An of China CSI HK Dividend ETF – tracks the CSI Hong Kong Dividend Index
- 3072.HK Nikko AM Global Internet ETF – tracks the iEdge-Factset Global Internet Index
- (Delisted 2020-02-17) 3084.HK Value Japan ETF - tracks the FTSE Value-Stocks Japan Index
- (Delisted 2021-10-15) 3085.HK Vanguard FTSE Asia ex Japan High Dividend Yield Index ETF - tracks the FTSE Asia Pacific ex Japan, Australia and New Zealand High Dividend Yield Index
- 3086.HK BMO NASDAQ 100 ETF - tracks the Nasdaq 100 Index
- (Delisted 2020-12-20) 3095.HK Value China A-Share ETF - tracks the FTSE Value-Stocks China A-Share Index
- (Delisted 2016-12-30) 3098.HK Ping An of China CSI RAFI HK50 ETF – tracks the CSI RAFI Hong Kong 50 Index
- (Delisted 2023-12-31) 3100.HK E Fund CSI 100 A-Share Index ETF – tracks the CSI 100 Index
- (Delisted 2021-08-02) 3101.HK Vanguard FTSE Developed Europe Index ETF - tracks the FTSE Developed Europe Index
- (Delisted 2018-12-07) 3102.HK XIE Shares CLSA GARY ETF - tracks the CLSA GARY Net Total Return Index
- 3110.HK Horizons Hang Seng High Dividend Yield ETF - tracks the Hang Seng High Dividend Yield Index
- 3118.HK Harvest MSCI China A Index ETF - tracks the MSCI China A Index
- (Delisted 2019-11-04) 3120.HK E Fund CES China 120 Index ETF - tracks the CES China 120 Index
- (Delisted 2023-08-18) 3121.HK BMO MSCI Asia Pacific Real Estate ETF - tracks the MSCI AC Asia Pacific Real Estate Index
- (Delisted) 3126.HK Vanguard FTSE Japan Index ETF - tracks the FTSE Japan Index
- 3127.HK Horizons CSI300 Real Estate Index ETF – tracks the CSI 300 Index
- 3128.HK Hang Seng China A Industry Top Index ETF - tracks the Hang Seng China A Industry Top Index
- 3129.HK CSOP China CSI 300 smart ETF - tracks the China CSI 300 smart Index
- (Delisted) 3140.HK Vanguard S&P 500 Index ETF – tracks the S&P 500 Index
- 3143.HK BMO Hong Kong Banks ETF – tracks the NASDAQ Hong Kong Banks Index
- 3145.HK BMO Asia High Dividend ETF – tracks the NASDAQ Asia ex Japan Dividend Achievers Index
- 3147.HK CSOP SZSE ChiNext ETF – tracks the SZSE ChiNext Index
- 3150.HK Global X Japan Global Leaders ETF – tracks the FactSet Japan Global Leaders Index
- (Delisted 2019-11-29) 3156.HK GFI MSCI China A International ETF – tracks the MSCI China A International Index
- (Delisted 2022-08-31) 3157.HK ChinaAMC Hang Seng SmallCap Index ETF – tracks the Hang Seng SmallCap Index
- 3160.HK BMO MSCI Japan Hedged to USD ETF - tracks MSCI Japan 100% Hedged to USD Index
- 3161.HK ChinaAMC RMB Money Market ETF – The Fund seeks to achieve a long-term return in RMB in line with prevailing money market rates.
- 3162.HK iShares MSCI China A International Index ETF – tracks the MSCI China A International Index
- 3165.HK ChinaAMC MSCI Europe Quality Hedged to USD ETF – tracks the MSCI Europe Quality 100% Hedged to USD
- (Delisted 2021-10-15) 3169.HK Vanguard Total China Index ETF - tracks the FTSE Total China Connect Index
- 3171.HK Samsung Blockchain Technologies ETF –
- (Delisted) 3177.HK ComStage 1 DivDAX UCITS ETF – tracks the DivDAX Index (price index)
- 3188.HK ChinaAMC CSI 300 Index ETF - tracks the CSI 300 Index
- 9072.HK Nikko AM Global Internet ETF-U – tracks the iEdge-Factset Global Internet Index
- 82822.HK CSOP FTSE China A50 ETF - tracks the FTSE China A50 Index
- 82828.HK Hang Seng H-Share ETF – tracks the Hang Seng China Enterprises Index
- (Delisted 2022-09-13) 82833.HK Hang Seng HSI ETF – tracks the Hang Seng Index
- 83012.HK AMUNDI Hang Seng HK 35 Index ETF - tracks the AMUNDI Hang Seng HK 35 Index ETF
- (Delisted 2020-12-22) 83095.HK Value China A-Share ETF - tracks the FTSE Value-Stocks China A-Share Index
- (Delisted 2023-05-05) 83100.HK E Fund CSI 100 A-Share Index ETF – tracks the CSI 100 Index
- 83118.HK Harvest MSCI China A Index ETF - tracks the MSCI China A Index
- (Delisted 2023-03-22) 83127.HK Horizons CSI300 Real Estate Index ETF – tracks the CSI 300 Index
- 83128.HK Hang Seng China A Industry Top Index ETF - tracks the Hang Seng China A Industry Top Index
- 83129.HK BOCHK Greater Bay Area Climate Transition ETF - tracks the S&P BOCHK China Hong Kong Greater Bay Area Net Zero 2050 Climate Transition Index
- 83147.HK CSOP SZSE ChiNext ETF – tracks the SZSE ChiNext Index
- (Delisted 2019-12-09) 83150.HK Harvest CSI Smallcap 500 Index ETF – tracks the CSI Smallcap 500 Index
- (Delisted 2019-11-29) 83156.HK GFI MSCI China A International ETF – tracks the MSCI China A International Index
- (Delisted 2018-06-01) 83162.HK iShares MSCI China A International Index ETF – tracks the MSCI China A International Index
- 83188.HK ChinaAMC CSI 300 Index ETF - tracks the CSI 300 Index
- (Delisted 2023-04-21) 3186:HK CICC KraneShares CSI China Internet Index Etf - tracks the CSI Overseas China Internet Index

=== Synthetic ===
- 2816.HK db x-trackers CSI300 Real Estate Index ETF – tracks the CSI300 Real Estate Index
- 2823.HK iShares FTSE A50 China Index ETF – tracks the FTSE China A50 Index
- 2827.HK W.I.S.E. - CSI 300 China Tracker – tracks the CSI 300 Index
- 2846.HK iShares CSI 300 A-Share Index ETF - tracks the CSI 300 Index
- 3009.HK db x-trackers MSCI EMERGING MARKETS INDEX UCITS ETF - tracks the MSCI Total Return Net Emerging Markets Index
- 3013.HK db x-trackers MSCI AC Asia Ex Jap H Div Yield Idx UCITS ETF - tracks the MSCI AC Asia ex Japan High Dividend Yield Index
- 3019.HK db x-trackers MSCI WORLD INDEX UCITS ETF - tracks the MSCI Total Return Net World Index
- 3020.HK db x-trackers MSCI USA INDEX UCITS ETF - tracks the MSCI Total Return Net USA Index
- 3027.HK db x-trackers MSCI RUSSIA CAPPED INDEX UCITS ETF - tracks the MSCI Russia Capped Index
- 3035.HK db x-trackers MSCI EM ASIA INDEX UCITS ETF - tracks the MSCI Total Return Net Emerging Markets Asia Index
- 3049.HK db x-trackers CSI300 UCITS ETF - tracks the CSI 300 Index
- 3087.HK db x-trackers FTSE Vietnam UCITS ETF
- 3105.HK db x-trackers MSCI Bangladesh IM Index UCITS ETF - tracks the MSCI Bangladesh Investable Market Total Return Net Index
- 3106.HK db x-trackers MSCI Pakistan IM Index UCITS ETF - tracks the MSCI Pakistan Investable Market Total Return Net Index

== Bond ETFs ==
- 2808.HK E Fund Citi Chinese Government Bond 5-10 Years Index ETF - tracks Citi Chinese Government Bond 5-10 Years Index
- 2819.HK ABF HK IDX ETF – tracks the iBoxx ABF Hong Kong Index
- 2821.HK ABF Pan Asia Bond Index Fund – tracks the iBoxx ABF Pan-Asia Index
- 3122.HK CSOP China Ultra Short-Term Bond ETF – tracks the Citi Chinese Government and Policy Bank Bond 0-1 Year Select Index
- 09141.HK BMO Asia USD Investment Grade Bond ETF – tracks the Barclays Asia USD Investment Grade Bond Index
- 09199.HK CSOP China 5-year Treasury Bond ETF – tracks the China Bond 5-year Treasury Bond Index
- 82808.HK E Fund Citi Chinese Government Bond 5-10 Years Index ETF - tracks Citi Chinese Government Bond 5-10 Years Index
- 83122.HK CSOP China Ultra Short-Term Bond ETF – tracks the Citi Chinese Government and Policy Bank Bond 0-1 Year Select Index
- 83199.HK CSOP China 5-year Treasury Bond ETF – tracks the China Bond 5-year Treasury Bond Index
- 3079.HK Bloomberg Barclays China Treasury 1-10 Years Index

== Commodity ETFs ==
- 2840.HK SPDR GOLD TRUST – tracks the Gold Price
- 3081.HK Value Gold ETF - tracks the London Gold Fixing Price in USD (A.M.)
- 83081.HK Value Gold ETF - tracks the London Gold Fixing Price in USD (A.M.)
- 83168.HK Hang Seng RMB Gold ETF – tracks the London Gold Fixing Price

== Money Market ==
- 3026.HK db x-trackers II AUSTRALIAN DOLLAR CASH UCITS ETF - tracks the Deutsche Bank AUSTRALIA OVERNIGHT MONEY MARKET TOTAL RETURN INDEX
- 9096.HK (USD) CSOP US Dollar Money Market ETF - Benchmarked with the FTSE 3-Month US Dollar Eurodeposit Index
- 3096.HK (HKD) CSOP US Dollar Money Market ETF - Benchmarked with the FTSE 3-Month US Dollar Eurodeposit Index

== See also ==
- List of exchange-traded funds
- List of American exchange-traded funds
