= Lists of exchange-traded funds =

The exchange-traded funds available on exchanges vary from country to country. Many of the ETFs listed below are available exclusively on that nation's primary stock exchange and cannot be purchased on a foreign stock exchange.

- List of American exchange-traded funds
- List of Australian exchange-traded funds
- List of Canadian exchange-traded funds
- List of European exchange-traded funds
- List of Hong Kong exchange-traded funds
- List of Indian exchange-traded funds
- List of Indonesian exchange-traded funds
- List of Japanese exchange-traded funds
- List of New Zealand exchange-traded funds
- List of Singaporean exchange-traded funds
- List of South African exchange-traded funds
- List of South Korean exchange-traded funds
- List of Taiwan exchange-traded funds

== See also ==
- Exchange-traded fund
- Exchange-traded product
- List of hedge funds
- List of private-equity firms
- List of investment banks
- Fund of funds
- Boutique investment bank
- Open-end fund
- Sovereign wealth fund
