= IWB =

IWBET may refer to:

- Inside-the-waistband holsters, a category of handgun holster
- Interactive whiteboard, a large interactive display in the form factor of a whiteboard
- iShares Russell 1000 (ticker: IWB), an exchange-traded fund of US stocks

I̅W̅B̅ may refer to:

- S̅O̅S̅
