= MZY =

MZY may refer to:

- MZY, IATA code for Mossel Bay Airport, on the List of airports in South Africa
- mzy, ISO code for Mozambican Sign Language
- MZY, Smartshares Australian Mid Cap fund on the List of New Zealand exchange-traded funds
