= List of Taiwan exchange-traded funds =

These are the lists of notable Taiwan exchange-traded funds, or ETFs.

== Domestic ETFs ==
=== ETFs with Domestic Component Securities ===
The component stocks of these ETFs are Taiwanese companies listed on Taiwan Stock Exchange or Gre Tai Securities Market (Taiwan OTC market):

- 0050 Yuanta/P-shares Taiwan Top 50 ETF – tracks the FTSE TWSE Taiwan 50 Index
- 0051 Yuanta/P-shares Taiwan Mid-Cap 100 ETF
- 0052 Fubon Taiwan Technology ETF - tracks the TSEC Taiwan Technology Index
- 0053 Yuanta/P-shares Taiwan Electronics Tech ETF
- 0054 Yuanta/P-shares S&P Custom China Play 50 ETF
- 0055 Yuanta/P-shares MSCI Taiwan Financials ETF
- 0056 Yuanta/P-shares Taiwan Dividend Plus ETF
- 0057 Fubon MSCI Taiwan ETF
- ~~0058 Fubon Taiwan Eight Industries ETF~~ delisted
- ~~0059 Fubon Taiwan Finance ETF - tracks the TSEC Taiwan Finance and Insurance Index~~ delisted
- ~~0060 Yuanta/P-shares TSEC Taiwan Non-Tech 50 ETF~~. This ETF was delisted on February 26, 2016.
- 006201 Yuanta/P-shares Taiwan GreTai 50 ETF, tracks GreTai 50 Index
- 006203 Yuanta/ P-shares MSCI Taiwan ETF
- 006204 Sinopac Taiwan TAIEX Index ETF
- 006208 Fubon Taiwan 50 Index ETF – same as 0050, tracks the FTSE TWSE Taiwan 50 Index

=== ETFs with Offshore Component Securities ===
These ETFs are issued by Taiwanese investment companies, including Yuanta and Fubon, while their component stocks are listed on Hong Kong Stock Exchange (HKSE), Shanghai Stock Exchange (SSE), or Shenzhen Stock Exchange (SZSE):

- 006205 Fubon SSE 180 Index ETF, tracks SSE 180 index
- 006206 Yuanta SSE 50 Securities Investment Trust Fund ETF, tracks SSE 50 index
- 006207 Fuh Hwa CSI 300 A Shares ETF, tracks CSI 300 Index
- 00636 Cathay FTSE China A50 ETF, tracks FTSE China A50 index
- 00639 Fubon SZSE 100 Index ETF, tracks SZSE 100 Index
- 00643 Capital SZSE SME Price Index ETF, tracks SZSE SME Price Index
- 00645 Fubon TOPIX ETF, tracks TOPIX Index
- 00646 Yuanta S&P 500 ETF, tracks S&P500® Index
- 00649 Fuh Hwa Hang Seng ETF, tracks Hang Seng Index
- 00652 Fubon NIFTY ETF, closely track the performance of NIFTY Index
- 0061 W.I.S.E. Yuanta/P-shares CSI 300 ETF, tracks CSI 300 Index

=== Bond ETF ===
Due to low trading volumes (liquidity problems) and discount to Net Asset Value (NAV) long since issuance, the beneficiaries voted and determined the sole bond ETF to be liquidated in 2013:

- ~~006202 Yuanta/P-shares Taiwan Government Bond ETF~~, tracked the GreTai Taiwan Treasury Benchmark Index, consisting of 5-year, 10-year and 20-year treasury bonds issued by Taiwan Government. This ETF was delisted on May 21, 2013 and liquidated on May 27, 2013.

== Offshore ETFs ==
These ETFs are also listed and traded in different currencies on other stock exchanges:

- ~~0080 Hang Seng Investment Index Funds Series - H-Share Index ETF~~, also listed at Hong Kong Stock Exchange This ETF was delisted on December 9, 2015.
- ~~0081 Hang Seng Investment Index Funds Series II - Hang Seng Index ETF~~, also listed at Hong Kong Stock Exchange and Shenzhen Stock Exchange This ETF was delisted on December 9, 2015.
- 008201 BOCI-Prudential - W.I.S.E. - SSE 50 China Tracker, also listed at Hong Kong Stock Exchange

== Leveraged and Inverse ETFs ==
- 00631L Yuanta Daily Taiwan 50 Bull 2X ETF, closely track the 2X performance of Taiwan 50 Index
- 00632R Yuanta Daily Taiwan 50 Bear -1X ETF, closely track the inverse performance of Taiwan 50 Index
- 00633L Fubon SSE180 Leveraged 2X Index ETF, closely track the performance of SSE180 Leveraged 2X Index
- 00634R Fubon SSE180 Inversed Index ETF, closely track the performance of SSE180 Inversed Index
- 00637L Yuanta Daily CSI300 Bull 2X ETF, closely track the performance of CSI 300 Daily Return Leveraged 2X Index
- 00638R Yuanta Daily CSI 300 Bear -1X ETF, closely track the performance of CSI 300 Daily Return Inversed Index
- 00640L Fubon TOPIX Leveraged 2X Index ETF, closely track the performance of TOPIX Leverage 2X Index
- 00641R Fubon TOPIX Inverse -1X Index ETF, closely track the performance of TOPIX Inverse -1X Index
- 00647L Yuanta Daily S&P 500 Bull 2X ETF, closely track the performance of S&P 500R PR 2X Leverage Carry-Free Daily Index
- 00648R Yuanta Daily S&P 500 Inverse ETF, closely track the performance of S&P 500 PR Inverse Carry Free Daily Index
- 00650L Fuh Hwa Daily Hang Seng Leveraged 2X ETF, Closely track the performance of HSI Leveraged Index
- 00651R Fuh Hwa Daily Hang Seng Inversed ETF, Closely track the performance of HSI Short Index

== Futures ETFs ==
- 00635U Yuanta S&P GSCI Gold ER Futures ETF, closely track the performance of S&P GSCI Gold Excess Return Index
- 00642U Yuanta S&P GSCI Crude Oil ER Futures ETF, closely track the performance of S&P GSCI Crude Oil Enhanced Excess Return Index

== See also ==
- List of exchange-traded funds
- List of American exchange-traded funds
