= List of Japanese exchange-traded funds =

This is a list of notable Japanese exchange-traded funds, or ETFs.

- Listed in Osaka Securities Exchange
  - 1309 SSE50 Index Linked Exchange Traded Fund
  - 1312 Small Cap Core Index Linked Exchange Traded Fund (Russell/Nomura)
  - 1320 Daiwa ETF - Nikkei 225 – tracks the Nikkei 225
  - 1321 Nikkei 225 Exchange Traded Fund (Nomura) – tracks the Nikkei 225
  - 1328 Gold-Price-Linked Exchange Traded Fund
  - 1323 NEXT FUNDS FTSE/JSE Africa Top40 Linked Exchange Traded Fund
  - 1324 NEXT FUNDS Russia RTS Linked Exchange Traded Fund
- Listed in Tokyo Stock Exchange
  - 1305 Daiwa ETF-TOPIX
  - 1306 TOPIX ETF
  - 1308 Nikko Exchange Traded TOPIX
  - 1310 Daiwa ETF TOPIX Core 30
  - 1311 TOPIX Core 30 Exchange Traded
  - 1313 KODEX 200
  - 1314 Listed Index Fund S&P Japan Emerging Equity 100
  - 1316 Listed Index Fund TOPIX100 Japan Large Cap Equity
  - 1317 Listed Index Fund TOPIX Mid400 Japan Mid Cap Equity
  - 1318 Listed Index Fund TOPIX Small Japan Small Cap Equity
  - 1319 Nikkei 300
  - 1322 Listed Index Fund China A Share (Panda) CSI300
  - 1326 SPDR Gold Shares
  - 1325 NEXT FUNDS Ibovespa Linked Exchange Traded Fund
  - 1346 NEXT FUNDS REIT INDEX ETF
  - 1327 EasyETF S&P GSCI-Class A USD Unit
  - 1329 i Shares Nikkei 225
  - 1330 Nikko Exchange Traded 225
  - 1344 MAXIS TOPIX Core30 ETF
  - 1345 Listed Index Fund J-REIT (Tokyo Stock Exchange REIT Index) Bi-Monthly Dividend Payment Type
  - 1610 Daiwa ETF TOPIX Electric Appliances
  - 1612 Daiwa ETF TOPIX Banks
  - 1613 TOPIX Electric Appliances Exchange Traded
  - 1615 TOPIX Banks
  - 1617 NEXT FUNDS TOPIX-17 FOODS ETF
  - 1618 NEXT FUNDS TOPIX-17 ENERGY RESOURCES ETF
  - 1619 NEXT FUNDS TOPIX-17 CONSTRUCTION & MATERIALS ETF
  - 1620 NEXT FUNDS TOPIX-17 RAW MATERIALS & CHEMICALS ETF
  - 1621 NEXT FUNDS TOPIX-17 PHARMACEUTICAL ETF
  - 1622 NEXT FUNDS TOPIX-17 AUTOMOBILES & TRANSPORTATION EQUIPMENT ETF
  - 1623 NEXT FUNDS TOPIX-17 STEEL & NONFERROUS ETF
  - 1624 NEXT FUNDS TOPIX-17 MACHINERY ETF
  - 1625 NEXT FUNDS TOPIX-17 ELECTRIC APPLIANCES & PRECISION INSTRUMENTS ETF
  - 1626 NEXT FUNDS TOPIX-17 IT & SERVICES, OTHERS ETF
  - 1627 NEXT FUNDS TOPIX-17 ELECTRIC POWER & GAS ETF
  - 1628 NEXT FUNDS TOPIX-17 TRANSPORTATION & LOGISTICS ETF
  - 1629 NEXT FUNDS TOPIX-17 COMMERCIAL & WHOLESALE TRADE ETF
  - 1630 NEXT FUNDS TOPIX-17 RETAIL TRADE ETF
  - 1631 NEXT FUNDS TOPIX-17 BANKS ETF
  - 1632 NEXT FUNDS TOPIX-17 FINANCIALS (EX BANKS) ETF
  - 1633 NEXT FUNDS TOPIX-17 REAL ESTATE ETF
  - 1634 Daiwa ETF・TOPIX-17 FOODS
  - 1635 Daiwa ETF・TOPIX-17 ENERGY RESOURCES
  - 1636 Daiwa ETF・TOPIX-17 CONSTRUCTION & MATERIALS
  - 1637 Daiwa ETF・TOPIX-17 RAW MATERIALS & CHEMICALS
  - 1638 Daiwa ETF・TOPIX-17 PHARMACEUTICAL
  - 1639 Daiwa ETF・TOPIX-17 AUTOMOBILES & TRANSPORTATION EQUIPMENT
  - 1640 Daiwa ETF・TOPIX-17 STEEL & NONFERROUS METALS
  - 1641 Daiwa ETF・TOPIX-17 MACHINERY
  - 1642 Daiwa ETF・TOPIX-17 ELECTRIC APPLIANCES & PRECISION INSTRUMENTS
  - 1643 Daiwa ETF・TOPIX-17 IT & SERVICES, OTHERS
  - 1644 Daiwa ETF・TOPIX-17 ELECTRIC POWER & GAS
  - 1645 Daiwa ETF・TOPIX-17 TRANSPORTATION & LOGISTICS
  - 1646 Daiwa ETF・TOPIX-17 COMMERCIAL & WHOLESALE TRADE
  - 1647 Daiwa ETF・TOPIX-17 RETAIL TRADE
  - 1648 Daiwa ETF・TOPIX-17 BANKS
  - 1649 Daiwa ETF・TOPIX-17 FINANCIALS（EX BANKS
  - 1650 Daiwa ETF・TOPIX-17 REAL ESTATE

== See also ==
- List of American exchange-traded funds
- List of exchange-traded funds
