= TrimTabs Investment Research =

TrimTabs Investment Research, Inc.
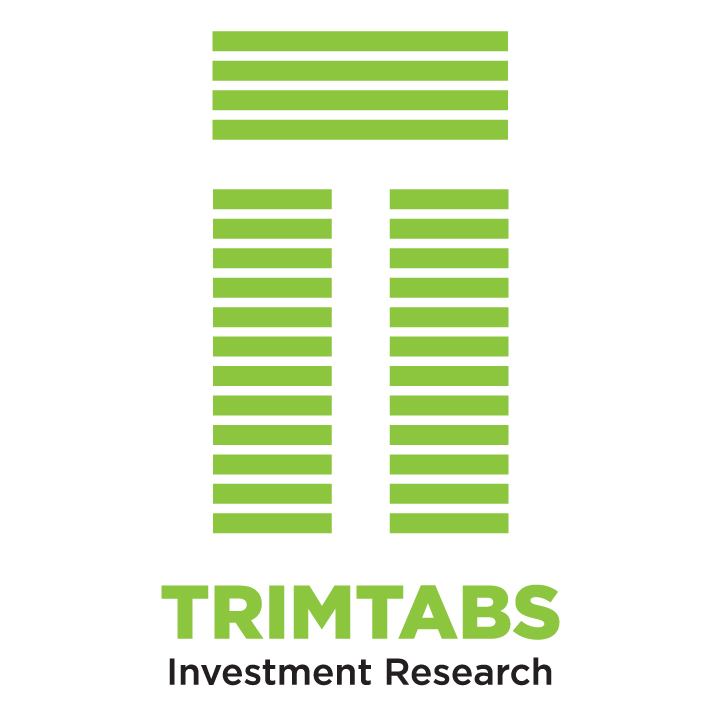
- Type: Private
- Industry: Financial services
- Genre: Financial services
- Founded: Santa Rosa, CA (1990)
- Founder: Charles Biderman
- Headquarters: Sausalito, CA, United States
- Key people: Charles Biderman, Chairman; David Santschi, Chief Executive Officer
- Products: Investment Research
- Number of employees: 5 (2016)
- Parent: EPFR.com
- Website: www.trimtabs.com

TrimTabs Investment Research, Inc. is an independent institutional research firm focused on equity market liquidity based in Sausalito, California.

== Reports ==
In addition to daily liquidity updates, TrimTabs publishes four weekly reports: The Weekly Liquidity Review], The Weekly Flow Report, The Weekly International Liquidity Review, and the Weekly Asset Allocation Report. In addition it offers two daily reports: the Overnight Liquidity Update and the Daily Liquidity Report.

The Weekly Liquidity Review is a publication that offers the broadest overview of the supply and demand dynamics of the U.S. stock market. It focuses on in-depth investment flows (demand) and corporate liquidity flows (supply) as well as macroeconomic trends. The investment flows include weekly updates that give investors short- and long-term trading signals based on the current and longer-term trends that TrimTabs observes in the U.S. and global stock markets. It also includes information on several financial model portfolios and the calls associated with each of the portfolios.

The Weekly Flow Report can include a quantitative focus, fund flows and sentiment indicators, analysis of short interest and commitments of traders, and hedge fund manager sentiment.

The Weekly International Liquidity Review includes fund flow and sentiment indicators for the following countries/regions: China, Developed Emerging Markets, Europe, Japan, Latin America and Pacific Asia ex-Japan. Also in this report are weekly updates of China margin debt and new account openings as well as fund flow and performance of international mutual funds and exchange-traded funds.

The Weekly Asset Allocation Report offers five tactical asset allocation portfolios with varying levels of risk, from conservative to aggressive. The portfolios apply TrimTabs’ proprietary research on mutual funds and ETFs. This report is most appropriate for financial advisors, retail brokers, and individual investors.

The Daily Liquidity Report is a quantitative report which provides a summary of TrimTabs liquidity data. It includes daily, monthly, and annual data on corporate actions, including insider trading; fund flows, including the flows of mutual funds and ETFs broken down by asset class, style, industry, and Morningstar category; and the TrimTabs Demand Index, a proprietary market timing indicator based on fund flow and sentiment variables.

In addition, TrimTabs offers eight model trading portfolios: The TrimTabs Demand Index Model Portfolio, U.S. Equity ETF Model Portfolio, the U.S. Sector Model Portfolio, the Nasdaq Model Portfolio, the Country Model Portfolio, the Bond Model Portfolio, the High Yield Bond Model Portfolio, and the Precious Metals Model Portfolio.

== Real-Time Macroeconomics ==
TrimTabs provides an assessment of the overall health of the U.S. economy by tracking wage and salary growth and employment growth based on real-time income tax withholdings data from the U.S. Treasury, credit indicators, unemployment claims, surveys of manufacturers and purchasing managers, and housing indicators.

The overall health of the domestic economy is update each week through their TrimTabs Macroeconomic Index (TTMI), a correlation weighted index of 16 leading economic indicators.

TrimTabs estimates wage and salary growth in real time. TrimTabs analyzes withholdings on a year-over-year basis without any seasonal adjustments or other statistical manipulation. T TrimTabs also uses withholdings to estimate changes in payroll employment on a monthly basis.

== Corporate history ==
Chairman Charles Biderman founded TrimTabs in Santa Rosa, California in 1990. He began his career as Alan Abelson's assistant at Barron's after earning an MBA from Harvard Business School. TrimTabs originally focused on providing stock trading ideas to hedge funds. Its first recommendation was the short sale of Midlantic National Bank, which traded in the high $20s in January 1990. Ultimately, Midlantic was taken over at a price of under $10 to save the bank from bankruptcy.

Biderman developed TrimTabs into the only independent research firm that would provide people with detailed daily coverage of U.S. stock market liquidity. In August 1995, he began to analyze U.S. stock market liquidity in what would later become TrimTabs Weekly Liquidity Review.

== The TrimTabs Float Shrink ETF (NYSE symbol: TTFS) ==
TrimTabs Asset Management partnered with AdvisorShares to launch the AdvisorShares TrimTabs Float Shrink ETF TTFS on October 4, 2011. "TTFS is sub-advised by TrimTabs Asset Management ("Portfolio Manager"), a subsidiary of TrimTabs Investment Research (TrimTabs). The Fund seeks to achieve this objective by investing in stocks with liquidity and fundamental characteristics that are historically associated with superior long-term performance. Charles Biderman was the CEO of TrimTabs and a Portfolio Manager for the ETF along with Minyi Chen. Subsequently, TrimTabs has filed with the SEC to launch their own self-indexed ETFs without the aid of AdvisorShares. On May 26, 2016, AdvisorShares announced that it had removed TrimTabs Asset Management as manager of its TrimTabs Float Shrink ETF, which had about $178 million in assets at the time. AdvisorShares replaced TrimTabs with Wilshire Associates, of Santa Monica, California, but offered no explanation for the change. The name of the fund was changed to the Wilshire Buyback ETF but despite the name change AdvisorShares kept the TTFS stock ticker. The TTFS ETF had earned a five-star Morningstar rating by delivering annualized returns of 19.22% as of March 31, 2016. TTFS had also outperformed both the NASDAQ Buyback Achievers Index by 2.2% annually and the Russell 3000 Index by 2.49% annually. "This is insane", TrimTabs CEO Charles Biderman said of the firing, "They came up with no reason, no nothing.” Charles Biderman claimed that it was nearly impossible for Wilshire to replicate TrimTabs stock selection methodology and his first move after the firing was to open a separately managed account with a lower minimum investment and lower fees than TTFS.
