= AdvisorShares =

US-based investment management firm

AdvisorShares Investments, Inc.
- Type: Private Limited Liability Company (LLC)
- Industry: Investment Management
- Founded: 2006
- Founder: Noah Hamman
- Headquarters: Bethesda, Maryland
- Key people: Noah Hamman; Dan Ahrens; James Carl
- Products: 22 Exchange-Traded Funds (ETFs): U.S. and International Equity, Fixed Income and Alternatives
- AUM: US$1.38 billion
- Parent: Fund.com
- Website: advisorshares.com

AdvisorShares Investments is a US-based investment management firm based in Bethesda, Maryland, which offers actively managed exchange-traded funds (ETFs) through the AdvisorShares Trust. AdvisorShares partners with third party financial advisers who already manage clients’ assets to package their investment strategy using exchange-traded funds. As part of promoting its funds it also provides educational support to help financial advisors and investors understand actively managed ETFs and their underlying investment strategies.

== History ==
Three former Rydex employees, Noah Hamman, Jacob Griffith and Joseph Barrato founded Arrow Funds in February 2006. Less than seven months after starting Arrow, in August 2006 Noah Hamman, while still acting as the CEO of Arrow Funds, established a separate company called AdvisorShares, allegedly without the knowledge of his two partners. The partners said this was a "violation to his fiduciary duty to Arrow [...] Hamman then systematically diverted to the benefit of himself and AdvisorShares opportunities, assets, and contracts that rightfully belonged to Arrow. [...] When Arrow began to learn of Hamman's competing activities and confronted him regarding those activities, Hamman engaged in further deceptive misconduct by affirmatively misrepresenting the nature and scope of his endeavors on behalf of AdvisorShares". Hamman was fired by Arrow on November 29, 2007, after the Arrow Management Committee claims to have discovered more information about the nature of Hamman's competing activities.

On October 31, 2008, Fund.com purchased its 60% stake in AdvisorShares for an initial payment of $275,000.

=== Application for Exemptive Relief ===
On November 7, 2008, Arrow commenced arbitration proceedings against Hamman and AdvisorShares for usurping Arrow's intellectual property including its business plan in establishing AdvisorShares. In January 2009, Arrow Funds requested a hearing with the SEC to challenge AdvisorShares' application for exemptive relief filed the previous month. Arrow and their counsel claimed that Hamman "To enable the Application to proceed, deliberately thwarted and delayed the selection of the Arbitration tribunal members." This request to block the application for exemptive relief was denied on July 20, 2009. "On March 1, 2010, Mr. Hamman, Arrow and the Members agreed to settle the Arbitration"

=== Unsuccessful Petition for Dissolution of Arrow Investment Advisors ===
On October 10, 2008, Noah Hamman petitioned (under §18-802 of the Delaware LLC Act) a Court in Delaware to dissolve Arrow Investment Advisors, LLC. He claimed that Arrow's managers had mismanaged the company and could not achieve the goals set forth in the original business plan. He alleged that Arrow's managers had: 1) "exposed the Company to liability by violating the particular federal securities laws and regulations under which the Company is required to operate, and have failed to seek appropriate supervision from the broker-dealer for the Company’s specific obligations as a FINRA-licensed representative" 2) "operated the Company for their own financial benefit, and have spent Company funds for their own private use and enjoyment, while paying wages to various employees in an erratic and tardy fashion." 3)"failed to provide to all members an annual operating plan for 2008 as required by the LLC Agreement". On April 23, 2009, the judge in the case dismissed the Petition with prejudice, as Hamman failed to provide factual evidence to back his claims and "Hamman was required to press his fiduciary claims in binding arbitration under the Arrow LLC Agreement". "Hamman suggests that merely stating these allegations, virtually without any factual support, is enough to survive a motion to dismiss. [...]Here, the Petition is devoid of any facts supporting Hamman’s first two allegations, such as which of the myriad federal securities laws Arrow must comply with were violated or for what improper personal purposes Barrato and Griffith used Arrow funds and approximately when and how much of Arrow’s funds they misused." The judge even speculated on a possible motivation for filing the suit: "And, although Hamman might be disappointed that he has been ousted from the management of a company he helped establish,"

=== Other ===
The firm launched its first active ETF in 2009. By 2014 it had 24 active ETFs and $1.83 billion under management. By August 2023, it had 22 ETFs with an average expense ratio of 1.27% and $1.01 billion in assets under management.

In October 2012 Esposito Securities LLC sued AdvisorShares, claiming that the parties signed a mutual nondisclosure agreement and that subsequently Dan Ahrens, an officer of AdvisorShares, began sharing confidential information with Esposito's clients and told them not to do business with Esposito.

The fund Pacer Pacific Asset Floating Rate High Income ETF NYSE: FLRT was originally launched as an AdvisorShares' product called the AdvisorShares Pacific Asset Enhanced Floating Rate ETF on February 18, 2015. On December 27, 2019, the fund was reorganized as Pacific Global Senior Loan ETF.

== Funds ==
=== The DENT Tactical ETF (NYSE symbol: DENT) ===
The Dent Tactical ETF commenced trading on the New York Stock Exchange on September 15, 2009, under the NYSE: DENT. The first product of AdvisorShares Investments, LLC, DENT was actively managed by HS Dent Investment Management, LLC, an independent economic research and forecasting company and publisher of The Dent Method.

HS Dent Investment Management was managed by financial author, Harry S. Dent Jr. According to Morningstar, Inc., DENT had highest expense ratio among ETFs, 1.5% of assets, as of July 2011.

DENT closed in August 2012.

=== The Mars Hill Global Relative Value ETF (NYSE symbol: GRV) ===
The Mars Hill Global Relative Value ETF commenced trading on the New York Stock Exchange on July 9, 2010, under the NYSE Ticker: GRV and was managed by Mars Hill Partners, LLC. GRV was the industry's first actively managed long/short ETF.

While GRV managed to raise $38 million a month after it launched, investors fled until the fund had only $3.2 million left. On December 1, 2011, Accuvest Global Advisors took over management of the fund and changed the name and ticker to AdvisorShares Accuvest Global Long Short ETF (AGLS). AGLS closed on August 7, 2015.

=== The Cambria Global Tactical ETF (NYSE symbol: GTAA) ===
The Cambria Global Tactical ETF commenced trading on the New York Stock Exchange on October 25, 2010 under the NYSE Ticker: GTAA and was managed by Los Angeles–based Cambria Investment Management and had a net expense ratio of 135 basis points. Mebane Faber and Eric Richardson were co-portfolio managers of the fund. The fund invested in underlying ETFs spanning all asset classes using a trend-based model. Cambria Investment Management and AdvisorShares separated on July 25, 2014. Cambria launched the successor to GTAA, the Cambria Global Momentum ETF (GMOM), at a management fee of 0.59%. North Carolina–based Morgan Creek Capital Management became GTAA’s new sub-advisor. GTAA finally closed on May 12, 2017.

=== The Global Echo ETF (NYSE Symbol: GIVE) and partnership with Philippe Cousteau Jr. ===
In May 2012, AdvisorShares launched the AdvisorShares Global Echo ETF NYSE: GIVE on the New York Stock Exchange focused on sustainable investing; the fund also said it would donate a portion of the fund expense fees to Global Echo Foundation, a nonprofit co-founded by Philippe Cousteau, Jr. focused on social issues impacting women and children to environmental conservation, as well as supporting social entrepreneurship. The fund's expense ratio was 1.7%, including 0.4% that was donated to the Global Echo Foundation. One potential concern investors may have had about investing in GIVE is that they didn't get a tax write-off for the portion of the management fee that was donated to the charitable foundation. GIVE closed on May 17, 2017.

=== The Peritus High Yield ETF (NYSE symbol: HYLD) ===
AdvisorShares teamed up with Peritus Asset Management to launch the AdvisorShares Peritus High Yield ETF NYSE: HYLD on December 1, 2010. HYLD was the first actively managed high yield bond ETF and was sub-advised by Peritus Asset Management. Tim Gramatovich was the Chief Investment Officer of Peritus and managed the fund with Ron Heller (tight end). By May 2014 the ETF had over $1 billion in assets under management. On December 8, 2017, it was announced that the AdvisorShares Board of Trustees had approved a transition of HYLD from the AdvisorShares Trust to the Amplify ETF Trust, which was expected to become effective in the second quarter of 2018. On June 22, 2018, Exchange Traded Concepts in conjunction with Eve Capital, announced the transfer of HYLD to the ETC ELF Trust.

=== The TrimTabs Float Shrink ETF (NYSE symbol: TTFS) ===
AdvisorShares teamed up with TrimTabs Investment Research to launch the AdvisorShares TrimTabs Float Shrink ETF NYSE: TTFS on October 4, 2011. TTFS was sub-advised by TrimTabs Asset Management ("Portfolio Manager"), a subsidiary of TrimTabs Investment Research (TrimTabs). The Fund sought to achieve this objective by investing in stocks with liquidity and fundamental characteristics that are historically associated with superior long-term performance. Charles Biderman was the CEO of TrimTabs and a Portfolio Manager for the ETF along with Minyi Chen.

Subsequently, TrimTabs filed with the SEC to launch their own self-indexed ETFs without the aid of AdvisorShares. On May 26, 2016, AdvisorShares announced that it had removed TrimTabs as manager of its TrimTabs Float Shrink ETF, which had about $178 million in assets at the time. AdvisorShares replaced TrimTabs with Wilshire Associates, of Santa Monica, California, but offered no explanation for the change. The name of the fund was changed to the Wilshire Buyback ETF but despite the name change AdvisorShares kept the TTFS stock ticker. The TrimTabs Float Shrink ETF had earned a coveted five-star Morningstar rating by delivering annualized returns of 19.22% as of March 31, 2016. TTFS had also outperformed both the NASDAQ Buyback Achievers Index by 2.2% annually and the Russell 3000 Index by 2.49% annually. "This is insane", TrimTabs CEO Charles Biderman said of the firing, "They came up with no reason, no nothing.” Charles Biderman claimed that it was nearly impossible for Wilshire to replicate TrimTabs stock selection methodology and his first move after the firing was to open a separately managed account with a lower minimum investment and lower fees than TTFS.

Over two years later on October 11, 2018, after the assets of TTFS fell to about $88 million, AdvisorShares again replaced the manager of the ETF to DoubleLine Equity LP and changed the name and ticker to AdvisorShares DoubleLine Value Equity ETF NYSE: DBLV. The fund switched its strategy to a fundamental value strategy. On September 1, 2022, after the assets fell to $46 million, AdvisorShares replaced DoubleLine and changed the name and ticker to AdvisorShares Insider Advantage ETF NYSE: SURE. Minyi Chen was brought back as the portfolio strategist for SURE and the strategy was changed back to focusing on float shrink and stock buybacks.
