= List of European exchange-traded funds =

This is a list of notable European exchange-traded funds, or ETFs. These are ETFs that are traded on European exchanges. (This list does not include ETFs that invest in European stocks but trade on other exchanges, such as the New York Stock Exchange. For example, the list below does not include the large Vanguard Europe ETF (ticker: VGK; name: Vanguard MSCI Europe ETF) which trades in the United States.)

== Cross-border ETFs ==
In the European Union many ETFs are traded as cross-border UCITS III funds. For example the UK iShares and ETF Securities are Irish registered UCITS funds and trade on the London Stock Exchange. Other ETFs are offered by Indexchange Investments AG, whose funds are listed in Germany on the Deutsche Börse. Indexchange was a subsidiary of HypoVereinsbank. It has been acquired by Barclays Global Investors.

- ETFS All Commodities DJ-AIGCISM
- ETFS Energy DJ-AIGCISM
- iShares DJ STOXX 50
- iShares DJ EURO STOXX 50
- Indexchange DJ Euro Stoxx EX
- Indexchange DJ Euro Stoxx 50 EX
- Indexchange DJ Stoxx 50 EX
- Lyxor ETF DJ Euro Stoxx 50
- Lyxor ETF MSCI Europe

== German ETFs ==
Deutsche Börse provides trading for more than 1000 ETFs in Frankfurt in its Xetra system. The ten largest ETFs on Xetra by fund volume are

- iShares Core S&P 500
- iShares Core DAX (DE)
- iShares S&P 500 (Dist)
- iShares Core Euro Corporate Bond
- Lyxor EURO STOXX 50
- iShares Core MSCI World
- iShares EURO STOXX 50 (DE)
- iShares Euro High Yield Corporate Bond
- iShares Euro Corporate Bond Large Cap
- iShares J.P. Morgan USD Emerging Markets Bond

Many other ETFs (relevant or not) are also traded at this and other German exchanges.

== Finnish ETFs ==
- SLG OMXH25 – It is a market value weighted index that consists of the 25 most-traded stock classes. Provided by Seligson & Co Fund Management
- XACT OMXH25 – Same as above by Handelsbanken Mutual Fund Company Ltd.

== Norwegian ETFs ==
Listed at Oslo Stock Exchange Oslo Stock Exchange

- DnB NOR OBX
- XACT OBX
- XACT Derivat BEAR
- XACT Derivat BULL

== Swedish ETFs ==
In Sweden XACT Fonder is the largest provider of ETFs with Nordic exposure. As of September 2010, 20 ETFs were provided by XACT: Updated 02.05.15 there are 10 active today:

- XACT Bull – leveraged ETF tracking approx.1,5 times daily OMXS30 returns, fee 0.6%
- XACT Bear – short leveraged ETF, tracking approx.1,5 times daily opposite OMXS30 returns, fee 0.6%
- XACT Bull 2 – leveraged ETF tracking 2 times daily OMXS30 returns, fee 0.6%
- XACT Bear 2 – short leveraged ETF, tracking 2 times daily opposite OMXS30 returns, fee 0.6%
- XACT Derivat Bull – leveraged ETF tracking 2 times daily OBX returns, fee 0.8%
- XACT Derivat Bear – short leveraged ETF, tracking approx.2 times daily opposite OBX returns, fee 0.8%
- XACT OMXS30 – tracking 30 most traded stocks on Stockholm Stock Exchange, fee 0.3%
- XACT OMXSB – tracking 80–100 most traded stocks on Stockholm Stock Exchange, fee 0.15%
- XACT OBX – tracking 25 most traded stocks on Oslo Stock Exchange, fee 0.3%
- XACT Nordic 30 – tracking 30 most traded stocks in the Nordic region (Sweden, Norway, Finland, Denmark), fee 0.15%

== ETFs in Central and Eastern Europe ==
The main ETF provider in the CEE region by country coverage is Sofia-based Expat Asset Management. Expat launched its first ETF product in 2016. As of January 2026, the company has 11 passive index UCITS ETFs listed in Frankfurt on Xetra and in Sofia on the Bulgarian Stock Exchange, with one fund listed on the London Stock Exchange too. The ETFs are following the major local equity indices of Greece (Athex Composite), Bulgaria (SOFIX), Serbia (BELEX15), North Macedonia (MBI10), Croatia (CROBEX), Slovenia (SBI TOP), Hungary (BUX), Romania (BET), Slovakia (SAX), Czechia (PX) and Poland (WIG20):

No.	Fund Name	Ticker	ISIN	Exchange
1	Expat Greece ASE UCITS ETF	GRX	BGGRASE06174	Xetra, BSE
2	Expat Czech PX UCITS ETF	CZX	BGCZPX003174	Xetra, BSE
3	Expat Macedonia MBI10 UCITS ETF	MKK1	BGMACMB06181	Xetra, BSE
4	Expat Bulgaria SOFIX UCITS ETF	BGX	BG9000011163	Xetra, LSE, BSE
5	Expat Romania BET UCITS ETF	ROX	BGROBET05176	Xetra, BSE
6	Expat Slovakia SAX UCITS ETF	SK9A	BGSKSAX04187	Xetra, BSE
7	Expat Slovenia SBI TOP UCITS ETF	SLQX	BGSLOBI02187	Xetra, BSE
8	Expat Hungary BUX UCITS ETF	HUBE	BGHUBUX01189	Xetra, BSE
9	Expat Poland WIG20 UCITS ETF	PLX	BGPLWIG04173	Xetra, BSE
10	Expat Serbia BELEX15 UCITS ETF	ESNB	BGSRBBE05183	Xetra, BSE
11	Expat Croatia CROBEX UCITS ETF	ECDC	BGCROEX03189	Xetra, BSE

The funds are traded in euro and are designed to give international investors exposure to country-specific risk in the CEE region in a well-known European UCITS ETF wrapper, where issues with market access, various local currencies, higher transaction and FX costs and wider spreads make it generally more difficult for non-local investors to allocate risk. The ETFs are functioning as conduits for capital flows between the international financial markets (Xetra, the London Stock Exchange) and the local capital markets of the countries in Central and Eastern Europe.

Expat also manages two AIF ETFs - an inverse (short) ETF on the SOFIX index of the Bulgarian capital market and a gold price tracker. Both funds are listed in Sofia on the Bulgarian Stock Exchange and traded in euro:

- Expat Bulgaria Short SOFIX ETF (ticker: BGXS, ISIN: BG9000002196)
- Expat Gold ETF (ticker: GLDX, ISIN: BG9000003202)

As of January 2026, Expat Asset Management is the only ETF provider from the CEE region on Xetra and the London Stock Exchange. Expat is also the only ETF provider for many of the local indices (i.e. in Bulgaria, Czechia, Slovakia, Serbia, North Macedonia) and the only provider with products readily accessible to international investors (traded on major international exchanges in EUR).

Other local ETF managers exist in Romania (Patria Asset Management), Croatia (InterCapital ETF), Hungary (OTP Investment Fund Management) and Poland (AgioFunds). However, their funds are listed on their respective local markets only, traded mainly in local currency (i.e. Romanian lei, Hungarian forints and Polish zloty) and therefore generally less accessible to international investors.

== See also ==
- List of exchange-traded funds
- List of American exchange-traded funds
