= Fund.com =

Fund.com Inc.
- Traded as: OTC Pink No Information: FNDM
- Founded: 2007
- Headquarters: New York City, US
- Key people: Jason Galanis

Fund.com Inc. is a US-based financial services information publishing company and fund platform that focuses on the fund management industry. Its aims were to provide a destination website for investments, including mutual funds, hedge funds, money market funds, exchange-traded funds (ETFs), closed-end funds, index funds, commodity funds and other types of pooled investment vehicles.

The company saw a significant decline in its share price after a soured business deal in late 2009 after which it has only traded in the “pink sheets”. Some of its senior executives were connected to Westmoore Capital from which Fund.com raised $1.5 million in 2008. Westmoore Capital was closed down by the SEC for running a $53 million Ponzi scheme.

== History ==
The company was formed through a reverse takeover in January 2008 of Eastern Services Group, a state and local tax advisor for Nevada casinos. After the merger the name was changed to Fund.com

=== Domain name purchase ===
In March 2008, Clek Media announced that it had brokered the sale of the domain name “Fund.com” for nearly $10 million in an all-cash transaction, to the company Fund.com Inc. Although never confirmed by the company itself, the purchase price would have been the highest recorded price paid for a web site domain up to that point, followed by Porn.com ($9.5 million) Business.com ($7.5 million) and Diamond.com ($7.5 million). However, some industry insiders have questioned the validity of the amount reported.

=== AdvisorShares acquisition ===
In 2008 the company purchased a 60% stake in AdvisorShares for an initial payment of $275,000, on October 31, 2008. Just a week later on November 7, 2008 Noah Hamman's former company, Arrow Funds, commenced arbitration proceedings against Hamman and AdvisorShares for usurping Arrow's intellectual property including its business plan in establishing AdvisorShares. However, Arrow's lawyers mentioned that an unsuccessful mediation had taken place prior to initiating the arbitration proceedings. In January 2009, Arrow Funds requested a hearing with the SEC to challenge AdvisorShares' application for exemptive relief filed the previous month. Arrow and their counsel claimed that Hamman "To enable the Application to proceed, deliberately thwarted and delayed the selection of the Arbitration tribunal members." This request to block the application for exemptive relief was denied on July 20, 2009. "On March 1, 2010, Mr. Hamman, Arrow and the Members agreed to settle the Arbitration"

=== Vensure Employer Services attempted acquisition ===
On November 4, 2009, Fund.com announced its purchase of an equity interest in Mesa, AZ.-based Vensure Employer Services, Inc., a professional employer organization that provides benefits and payroll administration, health and workers' compensation insurance programs, employee training and development services, and retirement benefits plans, such as 401k's, for small and medium businesses. The equity is represented by $21.9 million of participating preferred stock of Vensure.

Fund.com was unable to meet the contractual obligations of the purchase and the transaction was subsequently reversed.

=== Whyte Lyon Socratic acquisition ===
In November 2009, the company also announced that it had purchased 100% of the capital stock of Whyte Lyon Socratic, Inc., a developer of online education programs for investors, debtors and professionals. As part of that transaction, Whyte Lyon's president Joseph J. Bianco was named chairman of the board of Fund.com.

Whyte Lyon Socratic specialized in long-distance learning and assisting online students in developing the necessary skills to understand financial transactions and financial markets; develop money management skills to help them manage their income and wealth; and reach particular goals, including homeownership, debt reconciliation, and improved credit scores.

=== Decline ===
In September 2011 an unusually large 1 for 120 reverse split of Fund.com shares failed to stop the share price slide. Fund.com lost 99% of its value that year giving a market value of around $8.4 million

=== Recovery ===
In late 2016, Thomas Braziel was assigned as a receiver to Fund.com and investigated how he could monetize the remaining assets of the company on behalf of shareholders. Among other things, he is trying to recover the fund.com URL that the previous management sold in an allegedly fraudulent transaction involving John Galanis. In addition, fund.com and AdvisorShares settled a lawsuit over an ownership dispute. While AdvisorShare has already paid fund.com $2 million, Braziel is trying to recover an additional $2.2 million owed by AdvisorShares and unseal the terms of the confidential settlement made with the previous owners of fund.com. In July 2018 Braziel successfully recovered the fund.com domain name for the receivership and is pursuing further action against previous insiders and recovery of other assets. In July 2024 Braziel was stripped of his position as receiver.

== See also ==
- Exchange-traded fund
