= Tracker Fund of Hong Kong =

Hong Kong exchange-traded fund

Tracker Fund of Hong Kong 盈富基金
- Type: Exchange-traded fund
- Traded as: SEHK: 2800
- Founded: 1999
- Founder: HKSAR Government
- Headquarters: Central, Hong Kong Island, Hong Kong
- Website: www.trahk.com.hk

Tracker Fund of Hong Kong
- Chinese: 盈富基金
Transcriptions
Standard Mandarin
- Hanyu Pinyin: Yíng Fù Jījīn
Yue: Cantonese
- Yale Romanization: Yìhng fu gēi gām
- Jyutping: Jing4 fu3 gei1 gam1

Tracker Fund of Hong Kong or TraHK is an index exchange-traded fund (ETF) which provides investment results that correspond to the performance of the Hang Seng Index in the Hong Kong stock market.

== History ==
In 1998, the Hong Kong SAR Government acquired a substantial portfolio of Hong Kong shares to sustain linked exchange rate during the Asian Financial Crisis. To minimise disruption to the market, the Government chose to launch the initial public offering (IPO) of an ETF, the "Tracker Fund of Hong Kong", in November 1999 as the first step in its disposal programme. At the time of launch, it was the largest IPO in Asia (ex-Japan), with an issue size of HK$33.3 billion. State Street Global Advisors (SSGA) and State Street Bank and Trust Company (SSBT) were appointed as the fund manager and the trustee of TraHK, respectively.

In March 2022, Hang Seng Investment Management Limited, a wholly owned subsidiary of the Hang Seng Bank Limited, replaced SSGA as the manager of TraHK. In October 2025, HSBC Institutional Trust Services (Asia) Limited, a wholly owned subsidiary of the HSBC Holding plc, replaced SSBT as the trustee of TraHK.
