= List of Indonesian exchange-traded funds =

This is a list of notable Indonesian equity exchange-traded funds, or ETFs.

- Premier ETF LQ-45 (ticker: R-LQ45X) - tracks the Indonesia Stock Exchange LQ-45 Index
- Premier ETF IDX30 (ticker: XIIT) - tracks the Indonesia Stock Exchange IDX30 Index
- Premier ETF Syariah Jakarta Islamic Index (ticker: XIJI) - tracks the Indonesia Stock Exchange JII Index
- Premier ETF Indonesia Consumer (ticker: XIIC) - an active ETF representing Indonesia Consumer and Consumer-related sectors
- Premier ETF Indonesia State-Owned Companies (ticker: XISC)
- Reksa Dana Indeks Nusadana ETF IDX Value30 (Ticker: XNVE)

== See also ==
- List of exchange-traded funds
