= John Crudele =

American journalist

John Crudele is a columnist and business journalist in the United States. He writes syndicated political columns for the New York Post. Earlier in his career he worked for Reuters, The New York Times, and as a columnist for New York Magazine. He was also a Financial News Network host.

Crudele grew up in Brooklyn and graduated with a B.A. from Syracuse University and an M.A. from New York University.

Crudele covered Wall Street for Reuters in the 1980s. He joined the New York Times in 1985 and covered business and finance. He also wrote for New York Magazine.

In 1991 he wrote about the PATCO strike in 1981 and union issues.

In November 2013, the Columbia Journalism Review and Washington Post criticized a column he did alleging manipulation of employment data. In March 2017, U.S. President Donald Trump tweeted a column by Crudele criticizing the New York Times.
