= List of South Korean exchange-traded funds =

This is a list of notable South Korean exchange-traded funds.

All ROK-based ETFs, as of July 2012

KODEX ETFs are managed by Samsung Investments.
TIGER ETFs are managed by Miraeasset Investment Management.
KOSEF ETFs are managed by Woori Asset Management.

Market Index ETFs

- KODEX 200
- TIGER 200
- KOSEF 200
- KODEX Leverage
- TIGER Leverage
- KODEX Inverse
- TIGER Inverse

Sector-based ETFs

- KODEX Automobile
- KODEX Banks
- KODEX Construction
- KODEX Core Consumer
- KODEX Energy & Chemicals
- KODEX Insurance
- KODEX Securities
- KODEX Semiconductors
- KODEX Shipbuilding
- KODEX Steels
- KODEX Transportation
- TIGER Semiconductors
- TIGER Banks
- KOSEF IT
- KOSEF Banks

Style ETFs

- KODEX Samsung Group
- KODEX Sunlight
- TIGER Green
- TIGER Pure
- TIGER Mid-cap
- TIGER Samsung Group
- TIGER Hyundai Group+
- TIGER LG Group+
- KOSEF Large-cap
- KOSEF Mid-cap

Overseas ETFs

- KODEX China H tracking HSCEI
- KODEX Brazil tracking Brazil Titans 20 ADR Index
- KODEX Japan tracking TOPIX 100
- TIGER Latin tracking The Bank of New York Mellon Latin 35 ADR Index
- TIGER BRICs tracking The Bank of New York Mellon BRIC Select ADR Index
- TIGER NASDAQ100
- TIGER S&P500

Commodity

- KODEX Gold
- KODEX Silver
- KODEX Copper
- KODEX Soybean
- TIGER Crude Oil
- TIGER Agriculture
- TIGER Metals
- TIGER Precious Metals

Bond

- KODEX Treasury Bond

== See also ==
- List of exchange-traded funds
