= List of South African exchange-traded funds =

This is a list of South African exchange-traded funds, or ETFs and South African exchange-traded notes, or ETNs.

Top 40 Equity ETFs

- BettaBeta Equally Weighted Top 40 - The BettaBeta Equally Weighted Top40 Exchange Traded Fund tracks the performance of the companies in the FTSE/JSE Top 40 index, held in equal proportions of 2,5% each, calculated independently by the FTSE/JSE .
- Satrix 40 - The Satrix40 ETF is a convenient way to invest in a composite of the top 40 large cap shares on the JSE Securities Exchange .
- Bips Top 40 - Tracks the FTSE/JSE Top 40 Index - The 40 biggest companies on the Johannesburg Stock Exchange
- NewFunds eRAFI™ Overall - This eRAFI™ is created with the objective to track the performance of the eRAFI™ Overall SA index which is a fundamentally weighted calculated index verified by FTSE .
- NewFunds Shari’ah Top 40 - This FTSE/JSE Shari'ah Top 40 Index is designed to reflect the Shari'ah compliant companies identified from the FTSE/JSE Africa Top 40 index .
- Satrix SWIX Top 40 - The Satrix SWIX is a convenient way to invest in a FTSE/JSE Shareholder Weighted Top 40 Index of the JSE Securities Exchange
- NewFunds NewSA - NewSA tracks the performance of the NewSA index, a modified Top40 index .
- Satrix RAFI 40 - The Satrix RAFI is an ETF FTSE/JSE index that weights the underlying constituents using four fundamental factors (dividends, cash flow, sales and book value), rather than pure market capitalisation .
- StanLib Top 40 - This ETF consists of the shares that constitute the FTSE/JSE Top40 index of the Johannesburg Stock Exchange .
- StanLib SWIX 40 - This ETF consists of the shares that constitute the FTSE/JSE SWIX 40 index of the JSE .
- RMB Top 40 - The RMB Top 40 ETF portfolio invests in the 40 biggest companies listed on the JSE in proportion to their market capitalisation.

Equity Index ETFs

- Satrix FINI - The Satrix FINI is a convenient way to invest in a composite of the top 15 shares in the financial sector on the JSE Securities Exchange
- Satrix INDI - The Satrix INDI is a convenient way to invest in a composite of the top 25 shares in the Industrial sector on the JSE Securities Exchange
- Satrix RESI - The Satrix RESI is a convenient way to invest in a composite of the 10 resource shares listed on the JSE Securities Exchange
- NewFunds eRAFI™ Financial 15 - This eRAFI™ tracks the Financial 15 index (JSE financial sector based) calculated daily by the independent investment consulting firm Riscura .
- NewFunds eRAFI™ Industrial 25 - This eRAFI™ tracks the Industrial 25 index (JSE industrial sector based) calculated daily by the independent investment consulting firm Riscura .
- NewFunds eRAFI™ Resource 20 - This eRAFI™ tracks the Resources 20 index (JSE resource sector based) calculated daily by the independent investment consulting firm Riscura .
- NewFunds Equity Momentum - Equity momentum index, an index consisting of the 40 South African equity market shares, ranked by their relative price momentum over the assessment period, where shares with higher price momentum are given higher weightings and calculated daily.
- PrefEX ETF - The aim of the PrefEx Securities (PrefEx) is to track as closely as possible the FTSE/JSE Preference Share Index. PrefEx provides the price performance of the FTSE/JSE Preference Share Index as well as paying all dividends received from the FTSE/JSE Preference Share constituents quarterly.
- BettaBeta Green - The index consists of a selection of stocks from the top 100 largest South African companies listed on the JSE. Constituents are selected and weighted based on both environmental and liquidity criteria.
- RMB MidCap - The RMB MidCap ETF invests in the 41st to the 100th largest companies on the JSE in terms of market capitalisation.

Commodity ETFs

- NewGold - NewGold gives investors the opportunity to benefit from the performance of the value of Gold Bullion Debentures .
- 1nvestPalladium - The AfricaPalladium ETF is an exchange traded fund incorporated in South Africa. The fund is structured as non-interest bearing debentures that tracks the performance of the ZAR spot price of palladium.

Dividend ETFs

- Satrix Divi - The Satrix DIVI is a convenient way to invest in a tracker that tracks the FTSE/JSE Dividend Plus Index

Property ETFs

- Proptrax - Property Index Tracker or PropTrax is a property ETF in South Africa. It gives the investor access and good exposure to the high performance real estate sector of the JSE .
- Proptrax TEN - Tracks the performance of the top 10 securities, as measured by investable market capitalisation, in the SAPY index, meaning that every counter is given the same weight as the index (100%/10 = 10%) regardless of the market capitalisation

Currency ETFs

- NewRand - NewRand is an index tracker comprising 10 Rand hedge shares selected from the FTSE/JSE Africa TOP 40 Index .
- NewFunds TRACI 3 Month - An Index consisting of money market deposits of which the present value of these instruments constitutes and index. A convenient alternative to traditional non-listed products.

International Equity ETFs

- 10X Total World Stock - The Fund tracks the FTSE Global All Cap Index, which covers over 9,000 large-, mid- and small-cap companies in both developed and emerging markets .
- DBX Euro - The underlying of the db x-trackers DJ Euro Stoxx 50 ETF is the Dow Jones Euro STOXX 50® one of the most widely known European Blue Chip Indices .
- DBX UK - The underlying of the db x-trackers FTSE®100 ETF is the FTSE®100 index, the most important United Kingdom Blue Chip index .
- DBX Japan - The MSCI Japan Index is recognised as a barometer of the Japanese economy and as the holder of db x-trackers MSCI Japan Index ETF, an investor will essentially track the Japanese equity markets .
- DBX USA - The MSCI USA Index is recognised as a barometer of the United States of America economy and as the holder of db x-trackers MSCI USA Index ETF, an investor will essentially track the United States of America equity markets .
- DBX World - The MSCI World Index is recognised as a barometer of the world's developed economies and as the holder of db x-trackers MSCI World Index ETF, an investor will essentially track the developed world's equity markets .

Bond ETFs

- zShares GOVI - Zshares GOVI can be regarded as a core bond JSE-listed ETF which invests in government bonds .
- Ashburton Inflation ETF - To provide investors with a real rate of return in the form of a real yield plus a return linked to inflation (CPI), through exposure to a diversified portfolio of Government Inflation-Linked bonds. Formerly RMB Inflation-X.
- Bips InflationX - Tracks the South African Government Inflation Linked Bond Index - Linked to South African Consumer Price Inflation
- NewFunds Inflation Linked Bond Index (ILBI)- An index consisting of bonds issued by the South African government which are linked to the South African Consumer Price Index and calculated on a daily basis.
- NewFunds GOVI - The GOVI index tracks the total return version of the South African Bond Total Return Index, an index consisting of bonds issued by the South African government which includes only those issues in which the Department of Finance obliges the primary dealers to make a market and constituting the GOVI index.

Multi-Asset Class ETFs

- NewFunds MAPPS Growth - Contains a portfolio of South African equities (75% weighting), normal bonds (10% weighting), inflation linked bonds (10% weighting) and cash (5% weighting).
- NewFunds MAPPS Protect - Contains a portfolio of South African equities (40% weighting), normal bonds (15% weighting), inflation linked bonds (35% weighting) and cash (10% weighting).

Commodity ETNs

- Oil ETN - The Oil ETN offers investors a cost-effective and convenient way to take a long-term or short-term view on the performance of crude .
- Gold-Linker - Instead of owning, storing and insuring physical gold, investors can enter the gold market by purchasing this commodity-linker .
- Silver-Linker - Instead of owning, storing and insuring physical silver, investors can enter the silver market by purchasing this commodity-linker .
- Platinum-Linker - Instead of owning, storing and insuring physical platinum, investors can enter the platinum market by purchasing this commodity-linker .
- Palladium-Linker - Instead of owning, storing and insuring physical palladium, investors can enter the palladium market by purchasing this commodity-linker .

== See also ==
- List of exchange-traded funds
