= List of Singaporean exchange-traded funds =

This is a list of notable Singaporean exchange-traded funds, or ETFs.

- ABF Singapore Bond Index Fund
- CIMB FTSE ASEAN40 ETF
- CIMB S&P Ethical Asia Pacific Dividend ETF
- db x-trackers CSI300 UCITS ETF
- db x-trackers DB Commodity Booster Bloomberg UCITS ETF
- db x-trackers DB Commodity Booster Light Energy Benchmark UCITS ETF
- db x-trackers EURO Stoxx 50® UCITS ETFF
- db x-trackers FTSE China 50 UCITS ETF
- db x-trackers Markit iBoxx ABF Indonesia Government UCITS ETF
- db x-trackers Markit iBoxx ABF Korea Government UCITS ETF
- db x-trackers Markit iBoxx ABF Singapore Government UCITS ETF
- db x-trackers Markit iBoxx ABF Korea Government UCITS ETF
- db x-trackers MSCI AC Asia Ex Japan Index UCITS ETF
- db x-trackers MSCI AC Asia Ex Japan High Dividend Yield Index UCITS ETF
- db x-trackers MSCI Brazil Index UCITS ETF (DR)
- db x-trackers MSCI EM Asia Index UCITS ETF
- db x-trackers MSCI Emerging Markets Index UCITS ETF
- db x-trackers MSCI Europe Index UCITS ETF (DR)
- db x-trackers MSCI India Index UCITS ETF
- db x-trackers MSCI Indonesia Index UCITS ETF
- db x-trackers MSCI Japan UCITS Index
- db x-trackers MSCI Korea UCITS Index ETF (DR)
- db x-trackers MSCI Malaysia Index UCITS ETF (DR)
- db x-trackers MSCI Philippines IM Index UCITS ETF
- db x-trackers MSCI Singapore IM Index UCITS ETF (DR)
- db x-trackers MSCI Taiwan Index UCITS ETF
- db x-trackers MSCI Russia Capped Index UCITS ETF
- db x-trackers MSCI USA Index UCITS ETF
- db x-trackers MSCI World Index UCITS ETF
- db x-trackers S&P/ASX 200 UCITS ETF (DR)
- db x-trackers S&P 500 Inverse Daily UCITS ETF
- db x-trackers S&P 500 UCITS ETF
- db x-trackers US Dollar Cash UCITS ETF
- iShares Core S&P 500 ETF
- iShares MSCI India ETF
- iShares MSCI Singapore ETF
- iShares Barclays Capital USD Asia High Yield Bond Index ETF
- iShares J.P Morgan USD Asia Credit Bond Index
- Lyxor ETF China Enterprise (HSCEI)
- Lyxor ETF Commodities CRB
- Lyxor ETF Commodities Non-Energy
- Lyxor ETF Dow Jones Industrial Average
- Lyxor ETF FTSE EPRA/NAREIT Asia Ex-Japan
- Lyxor ETF Hong Kong (HSI)
- Lyxor ETF India (CNX Nifty)
- Lyxor ETF Japan (Topix)
- Lyxor ETF MSCI AC Asia-Pacific Ex Japan
- Lyxor ETF MSCI AC Asia Ex Japan
- Lyxor ETF MSCI Asia APEX 50
- Lyxor ETF MSCI India
- Lyxor ETF MSCI Korea
- Lyxor ETF MSCI Malaysia
- Lyxor ETF MSCI Taiwan
- Lyxor ETF MSCI Thailand
- Lyxor ETF Nasdaq-100
- Lyxor ETF MSCI Emerging Markets
- Lyxor ETF MSCI Europe
- Lyxor ETF MSCI Latin America
- Lyxor ETF Eastern Europe
- Lyxor ETF MSCI World
- Lyxor ETF Russia (DJ Rusindex Titans 10)
- Nikko AM Singapore STI ETF
- SPDR Dow Jones Industrial Average ETF
- SPDR S&P 500 ETF
- SPDR Straits Times Index Fund
- SPDR Gold Shares
- UNITED SSE 50 CHINA ETF

== See also ==
- List of exchange-traded funds
