= List of Indian exchange-traded funds =

List of all stock exchanges in India

== List of notable Indian exchange-traded funds ==
A few of the popular exchange-traded funds (ETF) traded on the National Stock Exchange of India of 25th April 2024 are

1. Nippon India
  - Nippon India ETF Nifty 1D Rate Liquid BeES (NSE: LIQUIDBEES) (Formerly called Reliance ETF Liquid BeES)
  - Nippon India ETF Nifty 50 BeES (NSE: NIFTYBEES)
  - Nippon India ETF Gold BeES (NSE: GOLDBEES) (Formerly called Reliance Gold Exchange Traded Scheme)
  - Nippon India ETF Nifty Next 50 Junior BeES (NSE: JUNIORBEES) (Formerly called Reliance Nifty Junior Exchange Traded Scheme)
  - Nippon India ETF Nifty 50 Shariah BeES (NSE: SHARIABEES) (Formerly called Reliance Nifty Sharia Exchange Traded Scheme)
2. ICICI Prudential Mutual Fund
  - ICICI Prudential S&P BSE Liquid Rate ETF (NSE: LIQUIDIETF and BSE: LIQUIDIETF)
  - ICICI Prudential Mutual Fund - Bharat-22 Index Exchange Traded Fund (NSE: ICICIB22)
3. HDFC Mutual Fund
  - HDFC Gold Exchange Traded Fund (NSE: HDFCMFGETF)
4. Invesco India
  - Invesco India Nifty Exchange Traded Fund (NSE: IVZINNIFTY)
  - Invesco India Gold Exchange Traded Fund (NSE: IVZINGOLD)
5. Kotak Mutual Fund
  - Kotak Mutual Fund - Gold Exchange Traded Fund (NSE: KOTAKGOLD)
  - Kotak Mutual Fund - PSU Bank Exchange Traded Fund (NSE: KOTAKPSUBK)
  - Kotak Mutual Fund - Banking Exchange Traded Fund Dividend Payout Option (NSE: KOTAKBKETF)
  - Kotak Mutual Fund - Nifty Index Exchange Traded Fund (NSE: KOTAKBKETF)
  - Kotak Mutual Fund - Sensex Index Exchange Traded Fund (BSE: KTKSENSEX)
  - Kotak Mutual Fund - Nifty NV20 Index Exchange Traded Fund (NSE: KOTAKNV20)
6. Motilal Oswal Mutual Fund
  1. Motilal Oswal MOSt Shares M50 ETF (NSE: MOM50)
  2. Motilal Oswal MOSt Shares M100 ETF (NSE: MOM100)
  3. Motilal Oswal MOSt Shares Nasdaq Index N100 ETF (NSE: MOFN100)
7. SBI Mutual Fund
  - SBI Gold Exchange Traded Scheme (NSE: SETFGOLD)
8. UTI Mutual Fund
  - UTI Gold Exchange Traded Fund (NSE: GOLDSHARE)
  - UTI Nifty Next 50 Exchange Traded Fund (NSE: UTINEXT50)

== List of all ETF listed on NSE ==
The following ETFs are listed on the National Stock Exchange of India as of 19th March 2021 :

Name	Ticker	External Link to Stock Exchange
Axis Gold ETF	AXISGOLD	https://www.nseindia.com/get-quotes/equity?symbol=AXISGOLD
Axis Nifty ETF	AXISNIFTY	https://www.nseindia.com/get-quotes/equity?symbol=AXISNIFTY
Bharat 22 ETF	ICICIB22	https://www.nseindia.com/get-quotes/equity?symbol=ICICIB22
BHARAT Bond ETF-April 2023-Gth	EBBETF0423	https://www.nseindia.com/get-quotes/equity?symbol=EBBETF0423
BHARAT Bond ETF-April 2025-Gth	EBBETF0425	https://www.nseindia.com/get-quotes/equity?symbol=EBBETF0425
BHARAT Bond ETF-April 2030-Gth	EBBETF0430	https://www.nseindia.com/get-quotes/equity?symbol=EBBETF0430
BHARAT Bond ETF-April 2031-Gth	EBBETF0431	https://www.nseindia.com/get-quotes/equity?symbol=EBBETF0431
BSL Bkg ETF	ABSLBANETF	https://www.nseindia.com/get-quotes/equity?symbol=ABSLBANETF
BSL Gold ETF	BSLGOLDETF	https://www.nseindia.com/get-quotes/equity?symbol=BSLGOLDETF
BSL Nifty ETF	BSLNIFTY	https://www.nseindia.com/get-quotes/equity?symbol=BSLNIFTY
BSL Nifty Next 50 ETF	ABSLNN50ET	https://www.nseindia.com/get-quotes/equity?symbol=ABSLNN50ET
CPSE ETF	CPSEETF	https://www.nseindia.com/get-quotes/equity?symbol=CPSEETF
DSP Liquid ETF	LIQUIDETF	https://www.nseindia.com/get-quotes/equity?symbol=LIQUIDETF
Edelweiss ETF-Nifty 100 Qua 30	EQ30	https://www.nseindia.com/get-quotes/equity?symbol=EQ30
Edelweiss ETF-Nifty 50	NIFTYEES	https://www.nseindia.com/get-quotes/equity?symbol=NIFTYEES
Edelweiss ETF-Nifty Bank	EBANK	https://www.nseindia.com/get-quotes/equity?symbol=EBANK
HDFC Banking ETF	HBANKETF	https://www.nseindia.com/get-quotes/equity?symbol=HBANKETF
HDFC Gold Exchange Traded Fund	HDFCMFGETF	https://www.nseindia.com/get-quotes/equity?symbol=HDFCMFGETF
HDFC Nifty 50 ETF	HDFCNIFETF	https://www.nseindia.com/get-quotes/equity?symbol=HDFCNIFETF
HDFC SENSEX ETF	HDFCSENETF	https://www.nseindia.com/get-quotes/equity?symbol=HDFCSENETF
ICICI Alpha Low Vol 30 ETF	ICICIALPLV	https://www.nseindia.com/get-quotes/equity?symbol=ICICIALPLV
ICICI Gold ETF	ICICIGOLD	https://www.nseindia.com/get-quotes/equity?symbol=ICICIGOLD
ICICI Midcap Select ETF	ICICIMCAP	https://www.nseindia.com/get-quotes/equity?symbol=ICICIMCAP
ICICI Nifty Low Vol 30 ETF	ICICILOVOL	https://www.nseindia.com/get-quotes/equity?symbol=ICICILOVOL
ICICI Pru Midcap 150 ETF	ICICIM150	https://www.nseindia.com/get-quotes/equity?symbol=ICICIM150
ICICI Pru Nifty Next 50 ETF	ICICINXT50	https://www.nseindia.com/get-quotes/equity?symbol=ICICINXT50
ICICI Prudential Bank ETF	ICICIBANKN	https://www.nseindia.com/get-quotes/equity?symbol=ICICIBANKN
ICICI Prudential IT ETF	ICICITECH	https://www.nseindia.com/get-quotes/equity?symbol=ICICITECH
ICICI Prudential Liquid ETF	ICICILIQ	https://www.nseindia.com/get-quotes/equity?symbol=ICICILIQ
ICICI Prudential Nifty 100 ETF	ICICINF100	https://www.nseindia.com/get-quotes/equity?symbol=ICICINF100
ICICI Prudential Nifty ETF	ICICINIFTY	https://www.nseindia.com/get-quotes/equity?symbol=ICICINIFTY
ICICI Prudential NV20 ETF	ICICINV20	https://www.nseindia.com/get-quotes/equity?symbol=ICICINV20
ICICI Prudential SENSEX ETF	ICICISENSX	https://www.nseindia.com/get-quotes/equity?symbol=ICICISENSX
ICICI Pvt Banks ETF	ICICIBANKP	https://www.nseindia.com/get-quotes/equity?symbol=ICICIBANKP
ICICI S&P BSE 500 ETF	ICICI500	https://www.nseindia.com/get-quotes/equity?symbol=ICICI500
IDBI Gold Exchange Traded Fund	IDBIGOLD	https://www.nseindia.com/get-quotes/equity?symbol=IDBIGOLD
IDFC Nifty ETF	IDFNIFTYET	https://www.nseindia.com/get-quotes/equity?symbol=IDFNIFTYET
Indiabulls NIFTY50 ETF	IBMFNIFTY	https://www.nseindia.com/get-quotes/equity?symbol=IBMFNIFTY
Invesco India Gold ETF	IVZINGOLD	https://www.nseindia.com/get-quotes/equity?symbol=IVZINGOLD
Invesco Nifty ETF	IVZINNIFTY	https://www.nseindia.com/get-quotes/equity?symbol=IVZINNIFTY
Kotak Banking ETF	KOTAKBKETF	https://www.nseindia.com/get-quotes/equity?symbol=KOTAKBKETF
Kotak Gold ETF	KOTAKGOLD	https://www.nseindia.com/get-quotes/equity?symbol=KOTAKGOLD
Kotak Nifty ETF	KOTAKNIFTY	https://www.nseindia.com/get-quotes/equity?symbol=KOTAKNIFTY
Kotak NV 20 ETF	KOTAKNV20	https://www.nseindia.com/get-quotes/equity?symbol=KOTAKNV20
Kotak PSU Bank ETF	KOTAKPSUBK	https://www.nseindia.com/get-quotes/equity?symbol=KOTAKPSUBK
LIC ETF-Nifty 100	LICNFNHGP	https://www.nseindia.com/get-quotes/equity?symbol=LICNFNHGP
LIC ETF-Nifty 50	LICNETFN50	https://www.nseindia.com/get-quotes/equity?symbol=LICNETFN50
LIC ETF-Sensex	LICNETFSEN	https://www.nseindia.com/get-quotes/equity?symbol=LICNETFSEN
LIC MF G-SEC Long Term ETF	LICNETFGSC	https://www.nseindia.com/get-quotes/equity?symbol=LICNETFGSC
Mirae Asset Nifty 50 ETF	MAN50ETF	https://www.nseindia.com/get-quotes/equity?symbol=MAN50ETF
Mirae Asset Nifty Next 50 ETF	MANXT50	https://www.nseindia.com/get-quotes/equity?symbol=MANXT50
Mirae Asset FANG+ ETF	MANXT50	https://www.nseindia.com/get-quotes/equity?symbol=MAFANG
Motilal Oswal M50 ETF	M50	https://www.nseindia.com/get-quotes/equity?symbol=M50
Motilal Oswal Midcap 100 ETF	M100	https://www.nseindia.com/get-quotes/equity?symbol=M100
Motilal Oswal NASDAQ 100 ETF	N100	https://www.nseindia.com/get-quotes/equity?symbol=N100
Nippon India ETF Bank BeES	BANKBEES	https://www.nseindia.com/get-quotes/equity?symbol=BANKBEES
Nippon India ETF Consumption	NETFCONSUM	https://www.nseindia.com/get-quotes/equity?symbol=NETFCONSUM
Nippon India ETF Dividend Opps	NETFDIVOPP	https://www.nseindia.com/get-quotes/equity?symbol=NETFDIVOPP
Nippon India ETF Gold BEES	GOLDBEES	https://www.nseindia.com/get-quotes/equity?symbol=GOLDBEES
Nippon India ETF HangSeng BeES	HNGSNGBEES	https://www.nseindia.com/get-quotes/equity?symbol=HNGSNGBEES
Nippon India ETF Infra BeES	INFRABEES	https://www.nseindia.com/get-quotes/equity?symbol=INFRABEES
Nippon India ETF Junior BeES	JUNIORBEES	https://www.nseindia.com/get-quotes/equity?symbol=JUNIORBEES
Nippon India ETF Liquid BeES	LIQUIDBEES	https://www.nseindia.com/get-quotes/equity?symbol=LIQUIDBEES
Nippon India ETF LongTerm Gilt	NETFLTGILT	https://www.nseindia.com/get-quotes/equity?symbol=NETFLTGILT
Nippon India ETF Nifty 100	NETFNIF100	https://www.nseindia.com/get-quotes/equity?symbol=NETFNIF100
Nippon India ETF Nifty BeES	NIFTYBEES	https://www.nseindia.com/get-quotes/equity?symbol=NIFTYBEES
Nippon India ETF Nifty IT	NETFIT	https://www.nseindia.com/get-quotes/equity?symbol=NETFIT
Nippon India ETF NV20	NETFNV20	https://www.nseindia.com/get-quotes/equity?symbol=NETFNV20
Nippon India ETF PSU Bank BeES	PSUBNKBEES	https://www.nseindia.com/get-quotes/equity?symbol=PSUBNKBEES
Nippon India ETF Shariah BeES	SHARIABEES	https://www.nseindia.com/get-quotes/equity?symbol=SHARIABEES
Nippon IndiaETF NiftyMidcap150	NETFMID150	https://www.nseindia.com/get-quotes/equity?symbol=NETFMID150
Quantum Gold Fund	QGOLDHALF	https://www.nseindia.com/get-quotes/equity?symbol=QGOLDHALF
Quantum Nifty ETF	QNIFTY	https://www.nseindia.com/get-quotes/equity?symbol=QNIFTY
SBI ETF IT	SBIETFIT	https://www.nseindia.com/get-quotes/equity?symbol=SBIETFIT
SBI ETF Private Bank	SBIETFPB	https://www.nseindia.com/get-quotes/equity?symbol=SBIETFPB
SBI-ETF 10 year Gilt	SETF10GILT	https://www.nseindia.com/get-quotes/equity?symbol=SETF10GILT
SBI-ETF Gold	SETFGOLD	https://www.nseindia.com/get-quotes/equity?symbol=SETFGOLD
SBI-ETF Nifty 50	SETFNIF50	https://www.nseindia.com/get-quotes/equity?symbol=SETFNIF50
SBI-ETF Nifty Bank	SETFNIFBK	https://www.nseindia.com/get-quotes/equity?symbol=SETFNIFBK
SBI-ETF Nifty Next 50	SETFNN50	https://www.nseindia.com/get-quotes/equity?symbol=SETFNN50
SBI-ETF Quality	SBIETFQLTY	https://www.nseindia.com/get-quotes/equity?symbol=SBIETFQLTY
Tata Nifty ETF	NETF	https://www.nseindia.com/get-quotes/equity?symbol=NETF
Tata Nifty Private Bank ETF	NPBET	https://www.nseindia.com/get-quotes/equity?symbol=NPBET
UTI Bank ETF	UTIBANKETF	https://www.nseindia.com/get-quotes/equity?symbol=UTIBANKETF
UTI Gold ETF	GOLDSHARE	https://www.nseindia.com/get-quotes/equity?symbol=GOLDSHARE
UTI S&P BSE Sensex Next 50 ETF	UTISXN50	https://www.nseindia.com/get-quotes/equity?symbol=UTISXN50
UTI-Nifty ETF	UTINIFTETF	https://www.nseindia.com/get-quotes/equity?symbol=UTINIFTETF
UTI-Nifty Next 50 ETF	UTINEXT50	https://www.nseindia.com/get-quotes/equity?symbol=UTINEXT50
UTI-Sensex ETF	UTISENSETF	https://www.nseindia.com/get-quotes/equity?symbol=UTISENSETF

== See also ==
- List of exchange-traded funds
