= Taiwan Top50 Tracker Fund =

Exchange-traded fund

Taiwan Top50 Tracker Fund 元大寶來台灣卓越50
- Type: Fund
- Traded as: (TWSE: 0050, SEHK: 3002) (Chinese: 台灣50)
- Founded: 2003
- Headquarters: Taipei, Taiwan

Fubon FTSE TWSE Taiwan 50 ETF 富邦台灣采吉50基金
- Type: Fund
- Traded as: (TWSE: 006208, (Chinese: FB台50)
- Founded: 2012
- Headquarters: Taipei, Taiwan

The Taiwan Top50 Tracker Fund (TTT) is an exchange-traded fund holding Taiwan stocks. The fund tracks the FTSE TWSE Taiwan 50 Index.

== History ==
On August 19, 2009, Taiwan 50 (HKEx: 3002) was listed on the Hong Kong Stock Exchange, becoming the first Taiwan ETF with cross-border listing in Hong Kong.

On October 20, 2010, Taiwan Futures Exchange (TFE) announced Taiwan 50 as a marketable security for margin calls on futures transactions. After going ex-dividend on October 25 of the same year, the Taiwan 50 completed its dividend fill in 11 trading days, as foreign investors targeted large-capitalization stocks for buying.

After the Lunar New Year in 2011, foreign investors sold a lot of Taiwan stocks, and the proportion of foreign investors in the Taiwan 50 dropped drastically, but local corporations entered the market at a low price, and the total size of the fund grew against the trend. In June of the same year, foreign investors applied for conversion of their holdings into Taiwan 50s to avoid participating in the ex-dividend for equity shares and avoiding the 20% capital gains tax. In August of the same year, when Taiwan stocks fell hard, the Taiwan 50 became the first choice of the government stock banks to protect their stocks, and on August 9, it recorded a huge turnover of 137,654 shares.

== Top 10 holdings ==
- Taiwan Semiconductor Manufacturing Company
- Hon Hai Precision Industry
- MediaTek
- Delta Electronics
- ASE Group
- CTBC Financial Holding
- Fubon Financial Holding
- Quanta Computer
- United Microelectronics Corporation
- Cathay Financial Holding

(as of Jan. 2026)
