= List of New Zealand exchange-traded funds =

An exchange-traded fund (ETF) is an investment fund traded on a stock exchange that holds assets, rather than being a trading company. Such funds typically track an index. The New Zealand Exchange is the only provider of ETFs in New Zealand and has 35 of them, under the SmartShares brand. Some track New Zealand or Australian stocks, some invest directly into US listed Vanguard ETFs, and some have outsourced active management covering fixed income and cash.

Name	Code	Benchmark	Annual management fee
Smartshares New Zealand Dividend	DIV	S&P/NZX 50 High Dividend Index	0.54%
Smartshares New Zealand Mid Cap	MDZ	S&P/NZX Mid Cap Index	0.60%
Smartshares New Zealand Top 10	TNZ	S&P/NZX 10 Index	0.60%
Smartshares New Zealand Top 50	FNZ	S&P/NZX 50 Portfolio Index	0.50%
Smartshares New Zealand Property	NPF	S&P/NZX Real Estate Select Index	0.54%
Smartshares Australian Dividend	ASD	S&P/ASX Dividend Opportunities Index	0.54%
Smartshares Australian Mid Cap	MZY	S&P/ASX Mid Cap 50 Index	0.75%
Smartshares Australian Financials	ASF	S&P/ASX 200 Financials Ex-A-REIT Index	0.54%
Smartshares Australian Resources	ASR	S&P/ASX 200 Resources Index	0.54%
Smartshares Australian Property	ASP	S&P/ASX 200 A-REIT Equal Weight Index	0.54%
Smartshares Australian Top 20	OZY	S&P/ASX 20 Index	0.60%
Smartshares Asia Pacific	APA	Vanguard FTSE Pacific ETF	0.55%
Smartshares Emerging Markets	EMF	Vanguard FTSE Emerging Markets ETF	0.59%
Smartshares Europe	EUF	Vanguard FTSE Europe ETF	0.55%
Smartshares Total World	TWF	Vanguard Total World ETF	0.40%
Smartshares US 500	USF	Vanguard S&P 500 ETF	0.34%
Smartshares US Large Growth	USG	Vanguard Growth ETF	0.51%
Smartshares US Large Value	USV	Vanguard Value ETF	0.51%
Smartshares US Mid Cap	USM	Vanguard Mid Cap ETF	0.51%
Smartshares US Small Cap	USS	Vanguard Small Cap ETF	0.51%
Smartshares Global Bond	GBF	Barclays Global Aggregate Index	0.54%
Smartshares New Zealand Bond	NZB	S&P/NZX A-Grade Corporate Bond Index	0.54%
Smartshares New Zealand Cash	NZC	S&P/NZX 90-day Bank Bill Index	0.20%

== See also ==
- List of exchange-traded funds
