= Charles Biderman =

American businessman and investor

Charles I. Biderman
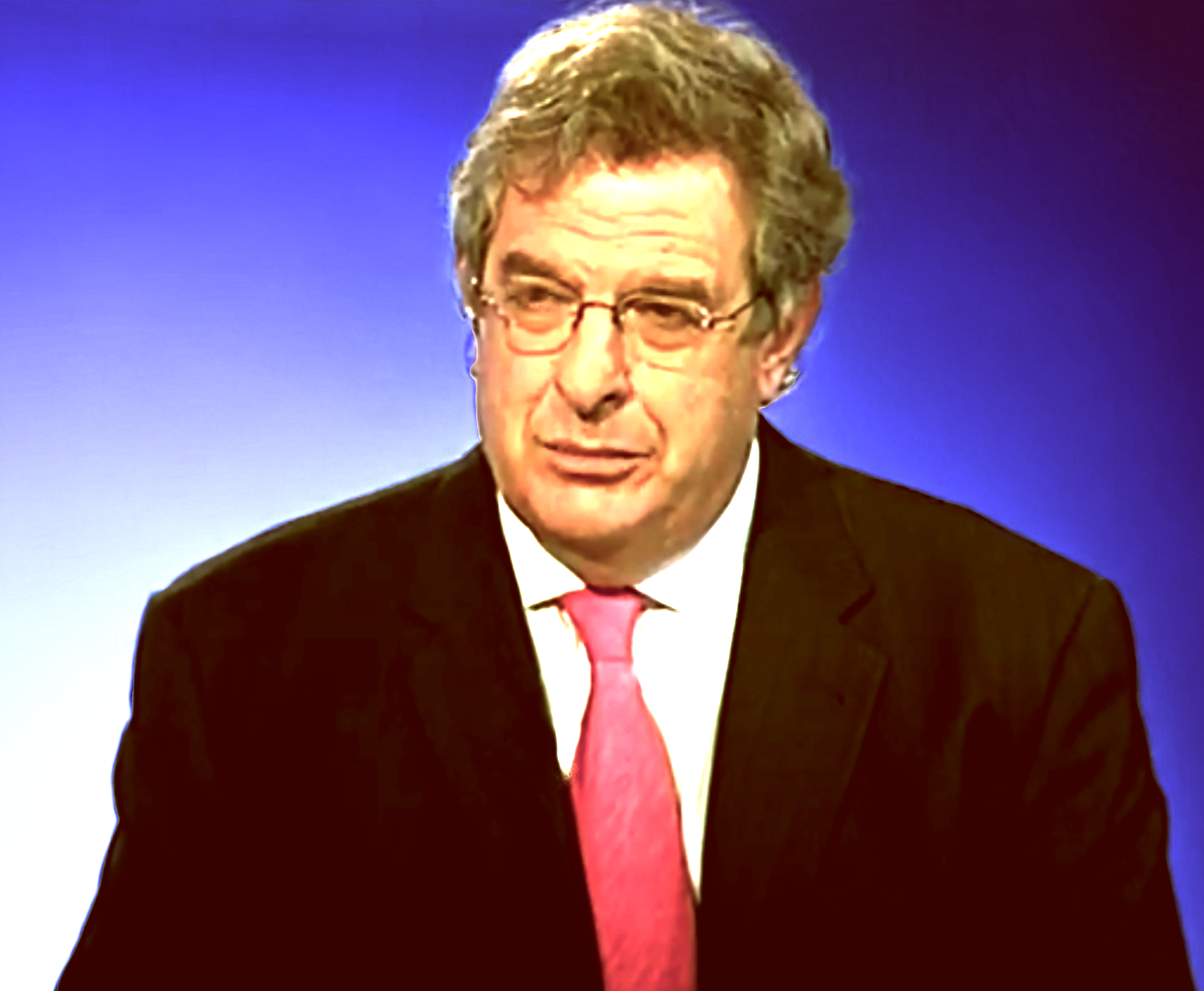
- Born: October 24, 1946 (age 79)
- Education: Harvard Business School; Brooklyn College
- Occupation: Economic Seer
- Years active: 1971 - Present
- Known for: Financial and Economic Forecasting and Asset Management
- Website: https://www.charlesbidermannews.com

Charles Biderman (born October 24, 1946) is an American businessman and investor. In 1990 Mr Biderman founded and became CEO of TrimTabs Investment Research and is the author of TrimTabs Investing: Using Liquidity Theory to Beat the Stock Market (John Wiley & Sons, 2005). During the 1990's, Charles specialized in short-selling and tracking mutual funds developing into the only independent research service publishing daily coverage of US stock market liquidity during the peak of his reign at Trimtabs Investing.

In 2018, he sold both TTIR and TrimTabs ETF asset management company.

Charles Biderman holds a B.A. from Brooklyn College and an M.B.A. from Harvard Business School and has been interviewed regularly on CNBC and Bloomberg TV and is quoted frequently in the financial media, including Barron's Magazine, The Wall Street Journal, Forbes, and Investor's Business Daily.

Currently he produces news stories and articles for CharlesBidermanNews.com and contributes ongoing to The Market, a financial media platform that provides analysis and ideas about the financial markets, global economy, and individual companies. It is associated with the Neue Zürcher Zeitung (NZZ), a Swiss newspaper.

Charles began his career as Alan Abelson's assistant at Barrons from 1971 to 1973. From there Charles predicted the collapse of real estate investment trusts (REITs) in 1972 and began to build his investment portfolio on real estate short-term selling. Soon thereafter, Charles became a general partner of several real estate limited partnerships starting in 1975, which owned and controlled over 1,000 apartments, office buildings in Dallas, Texas and Memphis, Tennessee and six strip shopping centers in Mississippi, Arkansas, Kentucky and Tennessee.

In 2011, Charles launched TrimTabs Float Shrink ETF NYSE: TTFS. "TTFS is sub-advised by TrimTabs Asset Management ("Portfolio Manager"), a subsidiary of TrimTabs Investment Research (TrimTabs). The TTFS ETF had earned a coveted five-star Morningstar rating by delivering annualized returns of 19.22% as of March 31, 2016. TTFS had also outperformed both the NASDAQ Buyback Achievers Index by 2.2% annually and the Russell 3000 Index by 2.49% annually.

On September 28, 2016 TrimTabs launched the TrimTabs U.S. Free Cash Flow Quality ETF under the ticker (BATS: TTAC) which used the same strategy as the TTFS ETF that they managed under AdvisorShares. The Fund's expense ratio was 0.59%. This was a reduction from the 0.99% fee that TrimTabs was required to charge under AdvisorShares. A year after launching TTAC produced more positive alpha than TTFS, while being more closely correlated to the Vanguard Russell 3000 ETF (Nasdaq: VTHR) benchmark. TTAC returned 27.08% in the November 2016 to December 2017 period, while TTFS only returned 19.4%. On November 29, 2021 the TrimTabs U.S. Free Cash Flow Quality ETF changed its name to the FCF US Quality ETF.
