= Zhongyukou =

Zhongyukou Township 中鱼口乡
- Township
- Location in Hunan Zhongyukou Township (China)
- Coordinates: 29°17′27″N 112°22′56″E
- Country: People's Republic of China
- Province: Hunan
- Prefecture-level city: Yiyang
- County: Nan

Area
  - Total: 94.5 km^{2} (36.5 sq mi)

Population (2017)
  - Total: 55,800
  - Density: 590/km^{2} (1,530/sq mi)
- Time zone: UTC+8 (China Standard)
- Area code: 0737

Zhongyukou (simplified Chinese: 中鱼口镇; traditional Chinese: 中魚口鄉; pinyin: Zhōngyúkǒu Zhèn) is a town in Nan County in Hunan, China. It was reorganized as a town from the former township of Zhongyukou in 2017.

The town was located in the middle west part of Nan County, it was bordered by the town of Nanzhou to the north, by the township of Wuzui and the town of Qingshuzui to the east, by the town of Sanxianhu to the south, and by the town of Mahekou to the west. It has an area of 94.5 km^{2} (36.5 sq mi) with a population of 55,800 (as of 2017). The town had 13 villages and 2 communities under its jurisdiction, its seat is Banzui Community (Chinese: 班嘴社区).

== History ==
The area of Zhongyukou was originally divided into Yougang Township (游港乡) and Zhongyukou Township which were amalgamated into the township of Zhongyukou in 2005.

== Administrative divisions ==
The township is divided into 27 villages and 2 communities, which include the following areas: Banzui Community, Yougang Community, Xiaobeizhou Village, Shuguang Village, Hongguang Village, Changdong Village, Guangfu Village, Changxi Village, Sixing Village, Shimatou Village, Dalu Village, Xiayukou Village, Zhongyong Village, Tongzhou Village, Fuxing Village, Jian'an Village, Xiaolanzhou Village, Yandong Village, Yanxi Village, Guangming Village, Xinzheng Village, Donghu Village, Tongmin Village, Fumin Village, Zhongmu Village, Yougang Village, Taojiahu Village, Ping'an Village, and Taihe Village (班嘴社区、游港社区、小北洲村、曙光村、红光村、常东村、广伏村、常西村、四星村、石码头村、大路村、下鱼口村、中永村、同洲村、复兴村、建安村、小兰洲村、艳东村、艳西村、光明村、新征村、东湖村、同民村、富民村、中木村、游港村、陶家湖村、平安村、太和村).
