= Nanzhou =

Nanzhou may refer to:

towns

- Nanzhou, Pingtung, a town in Pingtung County, Taiwan
- Nanzhou, Nan County (南洲镇), a town in Nan County, Yiyang, Hunan

other uses

- Nanzhou Station, a Guangzhou Metro station in Guangzhou, Guangdong, China
- Nanzhou (南州) or Nan Prefecture, the name of Zhangzhou between 945 and 966 during Southern Tang's nominal control
