= Hongjiacun =

Hongjiacun 洪家村社区
- Community
- Location in Hunan
- Coordinates: 28°34′08″N 112°23′39″E
- Community: People's Republic of China
- Province: Hunan
- City: Yiyang
- District: Heshan District
- Subdistrict: Heshan Subdistrict

Area
  - Total: 2 km^{2} (0.77 sq mi)

Population
  - Total: 13,698
  - Density: 6,800/km^{2} (18,000/sq mi)
- Time zone: UTC+8 (China Standard)

Hongjiacun (simplified Chinese: 洪家村社区; traditional Chinese: 洪家村社區; pinyin: hóngjiācūn shèqū) is a residential community of Heshan Subdistrict in Heshan District, Yiyang, Hunan, China. Located in the north of Heshan District, the community was formed in July 2002, it has an area of 2.0 km^{2} (0.77 sq mi) with rough population of 13,698 (2014).
