= Huage =

Huage Town 华阁镇
- Town
- Location in Hunan
- Coordinates: 29°18′01″N 112°39′22″E
- Country: People's Republic of China
- Province: Hunan
- Prefecture-level city: Yiyang
- County: Nan

Area
  - Total: 64 km^{2} (25 sq mi)

Population
  - Total: 44,000
  - Density: 690/km^{2} (1,800/sq mi)
- Time zone: UTC+8 (China Standard)
- Area code: 0737

Huage Town (simplified Chinese: 华阁镇; traditional Chinese: 華閣鎮; pinyin: Huágé Zhèn) is an urban town in Nan County, Hunan Province, People's Republic of China.

== Administrative divisions ==
The town is divided into 35 villages and 2 communities, which include the following areas: Fuxinggang Community, Hekou Community, Dongfanghong Village, Huadong Village, Fuxinggang Village, Tianrangang Village, Zengchan Village, Deshenggang Village, Shuanghua Village, Lianhua Village, Huahong Village, Huamin Village, Zhongling Village, Xiangdong Village, Yuge Village, Laohe Village, Lianhu Village, Xinyu Village, Zhongfutang Village, Tingtou Village, Fengcheng Village, Yangjiapu Village, Bainizhou Village, Shazhou Village, Beihe Village, Weidong Village, Dongping Village, Tongfeng Village, Huamei Village, Yidi Village, Wakou Village, Xiaodong Village, Jianhua Village, Dongjia Village, Anfu Village, Hekou Village, and Xinsheng Village (复兴港社区、河口社区、东方红村、华东村、复兴港村、天然港村、增产村、德胜港村、双华村、联华村、华红村、华民村、中岭村、向东村、裕阁村、老河村、莲湖村、新鱼村、众福堂村、汀头村、丰城村、杨家铺村、白泥洲村、沙洲村、北河村、卫东村、东坪村、同丰村、华美村、移堤村、挖口村、小东村、建华村、东浃村、安福村、河口村、新胜村).
