= Zhou Libo =

Zhou Libo may refer to:

- Zhou Libo (writer) (1908–1979), Chinese novelist and translator
- Zhou Libo (comedian) (born 1967), Chinese stand-up comedian
