= Jinpen =

Jinpen Town 金盆镇
- Town
- Location in Hunan
- Coordinates: 28°31′17″N 112°09′00″E
- Country: People's Republic of China
- Province: Hunan
- Prefecture-level city: Yiyang
- County: Nan County

Area
  - Total: 42 km^{2} (16 sq mi)

Population
  - Total: 26,000
  - Density: 620/km^{2} (1,600/sq mi)
- Time zone: UTC+8 (China Standard)
- Area code: 0737

Jinpen Town (simplified Chinese: 金盆镇; traditional Chinese: 金盆鎮; pinyin: Jīnpén Zhèn) is an urban town in Nan County, Yiyang, Hunan Province, People's Republic of China.

== Administrative divisions ==
The town is divided into 15 villages and 2 communities, which include the following areas: Jinqiao Community, Jinlu Community, Gezihu Village, Dadongkou Village, Xingwang Village, Xiangdao Village, Zengfu Village, Nanjinghu Village, Youyi Village, Xihujia Village, Jinfu Village, Wangjiaba Village, Tengfei Village, Dongdi Village, Youcheng Village, Qingcheng Village, and Yucheng Village (金桥社区、金鹿社区、格子湖村、大东口村、兴旺村、香稻村、增福村、南京湖村、友谊村、西湖浃村、金福村、王家坝村、腾飞村、东堤村、有成村、庆成村、玉成村).
