= Yiyang High-Tech Industrial Development Zone =

Yiyang High-Tech Industrial Development Zone 益阳高新技术产业开发区
- High-Tech Industrial Zone
- Location in Hunan
- Coordinates: 28°26′39″N 112°28′45″E
- Country: People's Republic of China
- Province: Hunan
- Prefecture-level city: Yiyang

Area
  - Total: 42 km^{2} (16 sq mi)
- Time zone: UTC+08:00 (China Standard)
- Postal code: 410300
- Area code: 0731
- Website: www.yygxq.gov.cn

Chinese name
- Traditional Chinese: 益陽高新技術產業開發區
- Simplified Chinese: 益阳高新技术产业开发区
Transcriptions
Standard Mandarin
- Hanyu Pinyin: Yìyáng Gāoxīn Jìshù Chǎnyè Kāifāqū

Yiyang High-Tech Industrial Development Zone (Chinese: 益阳高新技术产业开发区; abbr: YYHTZ) is a national high-tech industrial zone in Yiyang, Hunan, China. Its area is 42-square-kilometre (16 sq mi). It traces its origins to the former "Chaoyang Economic Development Zone" (朝阳经济开发区), founded in 1994. It was renamed to the present name, meanwhile the zone was upgraded to one of first batch of provincial HTZs. In 2011, it became a national HTZs approved by the State Council of China. Its four major industries are new materials, new energy, advanced manufacturing and biomedicine.
