= Wushenggong =

Wushenggong Town 武圣宫镇
- Town
- Location in Hunan
- Coordinates: 29°14′12″N 112°14′37″E
- Country: People's Republic of China
- Province: Hunan
- Prefecture-level city: Yiyang
- County: Nan

Area
  - Total: 42 km^{2} (16 sq mi)

Population
  - Total: 28,300
  - Density: 670/km^{2} (1,700/sq mi)
- Time zone: UTC+8 (China Standard)
- Area code: 0737

Wushenggong Town (simplified Chinese: 武圣宫镇; traditional Chinese: 武聖宮鎮; pinyin: Wǔshènggōng Zhèn) is an urban town in Nan County, Hunan Province, People's Republic of China.

== Administrative divisions ==
The town is divided into 18 villages and 1 community, which include the following areas: Nanyang Community, Defeng Village, Suifeng Village, Tongfeng Village, Lianfeng Village, Baiwan Village, Dongdi Village, Yonghe Village, Yugong Village, Tangjia Village, Xuejia Village, Tianfu Village, Taibai Village, Yonggan Village, Dongmei Village, Xinglong Village, Fuxing Village, Dexing Village, and Annan Village (南阳社区、德丰村、岁丰村、同丰村、联丰村、百万村、东堤村、永和村、禹贡村、唐家村、学家村、天伏村、太白村、勇敢村、东美村、兴隆村、伏星村、德星村、安南村).
