= Maocaojie =

Maocaojie Town 茅草街镇
- Town
- Location in Hunan
- Coordinates: 29°04′02″N 112°19′11″E
- Country: People's Republic of China
- Province: Hunan
- Prefecture-level city: Yiyang
- County: Nan

Area
  - Total: 95.3 km^{2} (36.8 sq mi)

Population
  - Total: 18,300
  - Density: 192/km^{2} (497/sq mi)
- Time zone: UTC+8 (China Standard)
- Area code: 0737

Maocaojie Town (simplified Chinese: 茅草街镇; traditional Chinese: 茅草街鎮; pinyin: Máocǎojiē Zhèn) is an urban town in Nan County, Yiyang, Hunan Province, People's Republic of China.

== Administrative divisions ==
The town is divided into 29 villages and 7 community, which include the following areas: Qianshao Community, Chaoyang Community, Yinhe Community, Babaigong Community, Kangzheng Community, Sanchahe Community, Maocaojie Community, Yonghong Community, Minhe Village, Da'an Village, Shuangfeng Village, Sibaigong Village, Qinghua Village, Babaigong Village, Fuxing Village, Fengchan Village, Chenpaihu Village, Dayou Village, Huajiao Village, Xinshang Village, Tongqing Village, Huanxin Village, Huimin Village, Jielong Village, Tongli Village, Hongyan Village, Weiyi Village, Lianxing Village, Xincheng Village, Zhihe Village, Yongding Village, Dacheng Village, Sanchahe Village, Changning Village, Jun'an Village, and Junfu Village (前哨社区、朝阳社区、银河社区、八百弓社区、康正社区、三岔河社区、茅草街社区、永红村、民和村、太安村、双丰村、四百弓村、庆华村、八百弓村、福兴村、丰产村、沉排湖村、大有村、划角村、新尚村、同庆村、换新村、回民村、接龙村、同利村、鸿雁村、唯一村、联兴村、新成村、直和村、永定村、大成村、三岔河村、长宁村、均安村、均富村).
