= Langbahu =

Langbahu Town 浪拔湖镇
- Town
- Location in Hunan
- Coordinates: 29°25′21″N 112°20′40″E
- Country: People's Republic of China
- Province: Hunan
- Prefecture-level city: Yiyang
- County: Nan County

Area
  - Total: 113.3 km^{2} (43.7 sq mi)

Population
  - Total: 53,700
  - Density: 474/km^{2} (1,230/sq mi)
- Time zone: UTC+8 (China Standard)
- Area code: 0737

Langbahu Town (simplified Chinese: 浪拔湖镇; traditional Chinese: 浪拔湖鎮; pinyin: Làngbáhú Zhèn) is an urban town in Nan County, Hunan Province, People's Republic of China.

== Administrative divisions ==
The town is divided into 24 villages and 2 communities, which include the following areas: Langba Community, Yabadu Community, Shanqiao Village, Taiyangshan Village, Langbahu Village, Shawan Village, Shijiadu Village, Liangtai Village, Baihezhou Village, Yunhe Village, Zhaohui Village, Hongxing Village, Yunfu Village, Sanchahe Village, Xinkou Village, Yimatou Village, Ji'anzui Village, Gaofengzui Village, Nanji Village, Nanhong Village, Jiejiazhou Village, Muluhu Village, Nan'an Village, Dongzhou Village, Hongyanhu Village, and Huameiyuan Village (浪拔社区、哑吧渡社区、山桥村、太阳山村、浪拔湖村、沙湾村、施家渡村、两太村、白合洲村、云和村、朝辉村、红星村、云伏村、三岔河村、新口村、绎码头村、吉安嘴村、告丰嘴村、南吉村、南红村、揭家洲村、牧鹿湖村、南安村、东洲村、红堰湖村、华美垸村).
