= Former Residence of Zhou Libo =

- 周立波故居
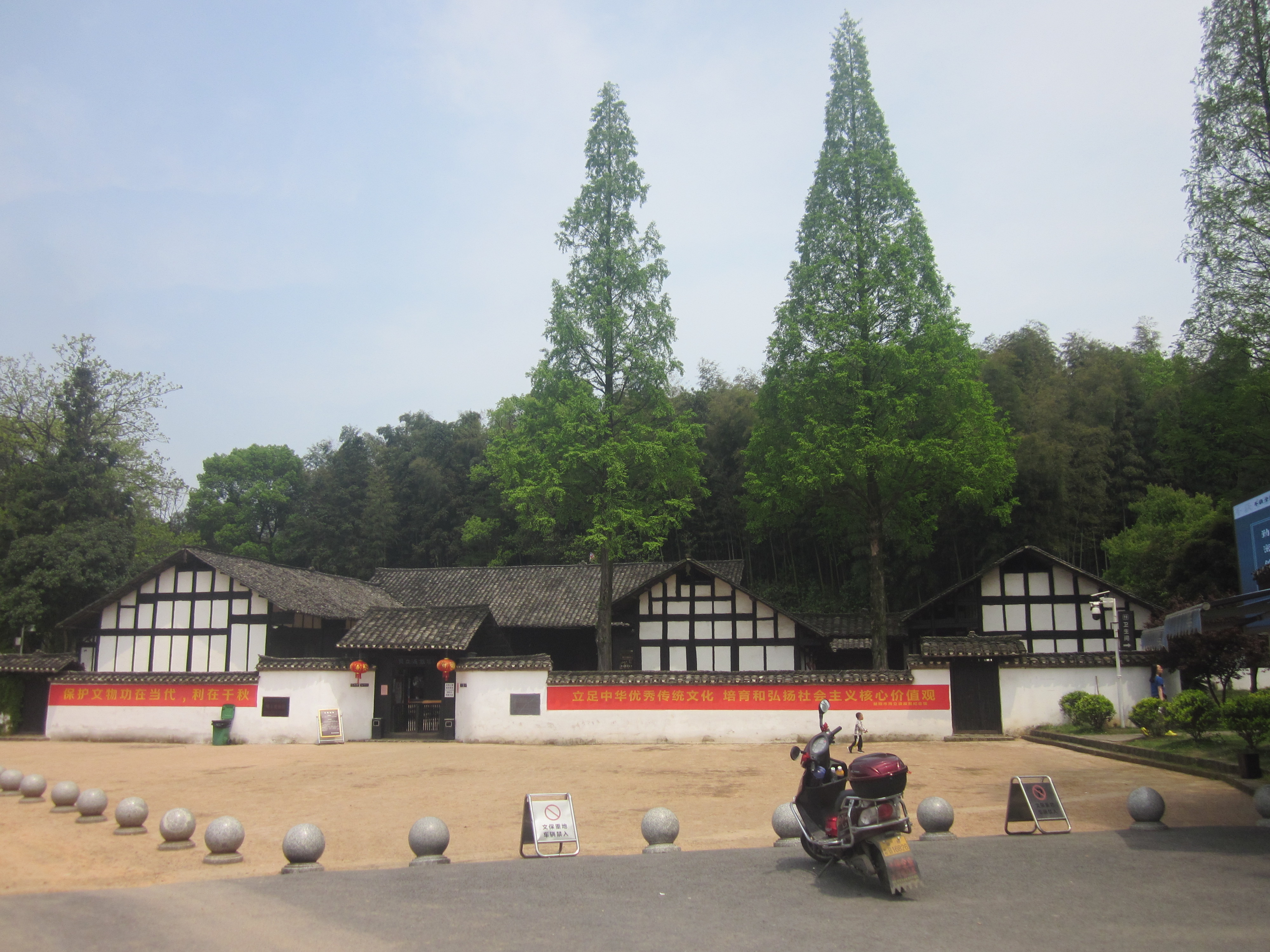
- Former Residence of Zhou Libo.

- Location within Hunan

General information
- Type: Traditional folk house
- Location: Xielingang, Heshan District of Yiyang, Hunan, China
- Coordinates: 28°32′32″N 112°19′34″E
- Completed: 1788

Height
- Roof: Gabbled roof

Technical details
- Floor area: 790 m^{2} (8,500 sq ft)
- Grounds: 1,510 m^{2} (16,300 sq ft)

The Former Residence of Zhou Libo or Zhou Libo's Former Residence (Chinese: 周立波故居; pinyin: Zhōu Lìbō Gùjū) is where Zhou Libo was born and lived from 1908 to 1924. It is located in the town of Xielingang, Heshan District of Yiyang, Hunan, China. It has been designated as a cultural relics protection unit in Hunan and patriotism education base in Hunan.

== History ==
The traditional folk house style residence was built in 1788, in the ruling of Qianlong Emperor of the Qing dynasty (1644–1911).

Zhou Libo was born here on August 9, 1908. In 1927, he left here for Changsha Provincial No. 1 High School. From 1955 to 1965, he wrote Great Changes Across the Land (山乡巨变) here.

It has been inscribed as a municipal cultural unit in 1997 and a provincial cultural unit in 2002.

== Architecture ==
The traditional folk house occupies a building area of 790 square metres (8,500 sq ft) and the total area of 1,510 square metres (16,300 sq ft). There are 28 rooms. Under the eaves is a plaque with the Chinese characters "Former Residence of Zhou Libo" written by Wu Jieping, former Vice Chairperson of the National People's Congress.

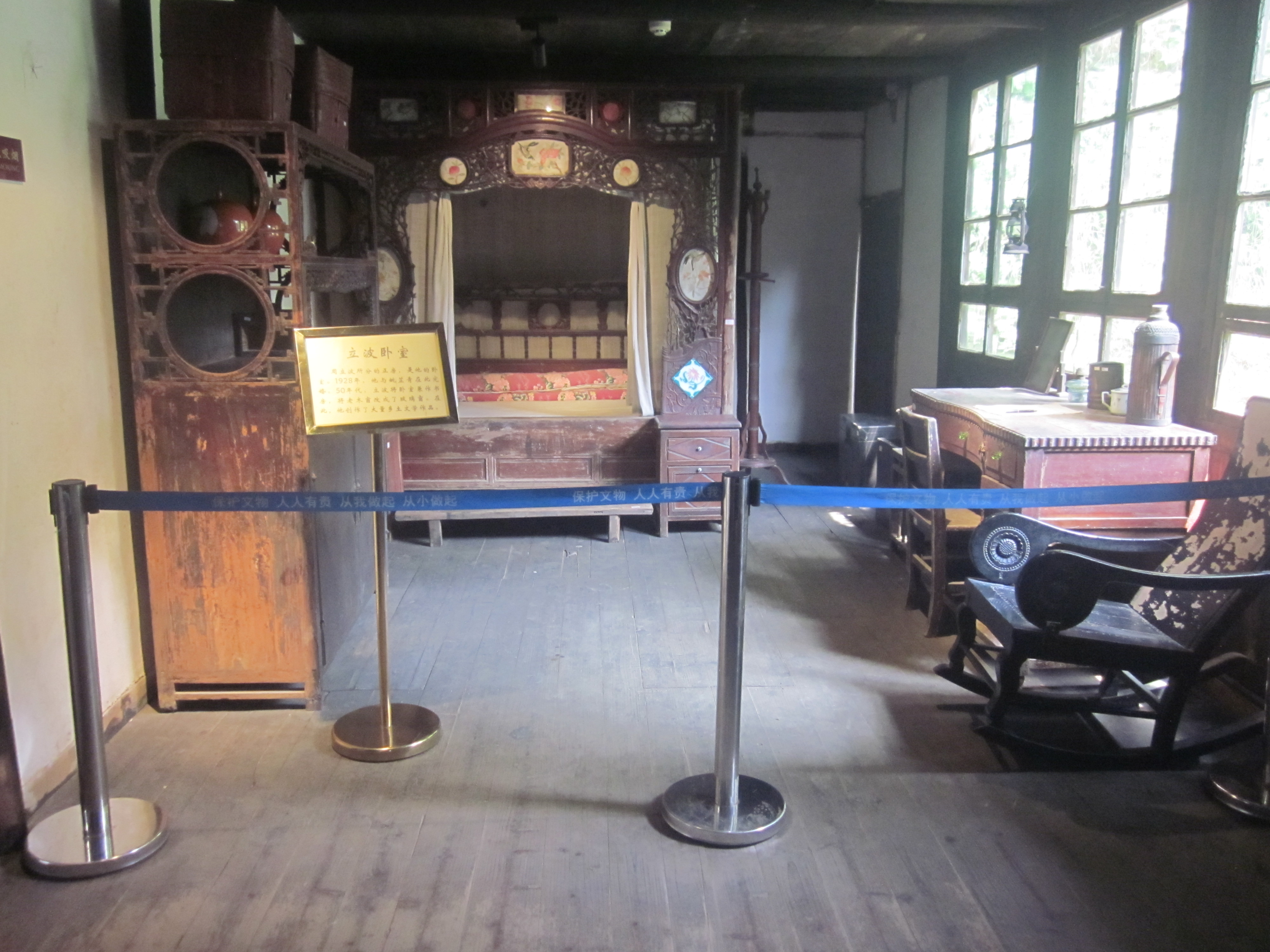
Bedroom of Zhou Libo

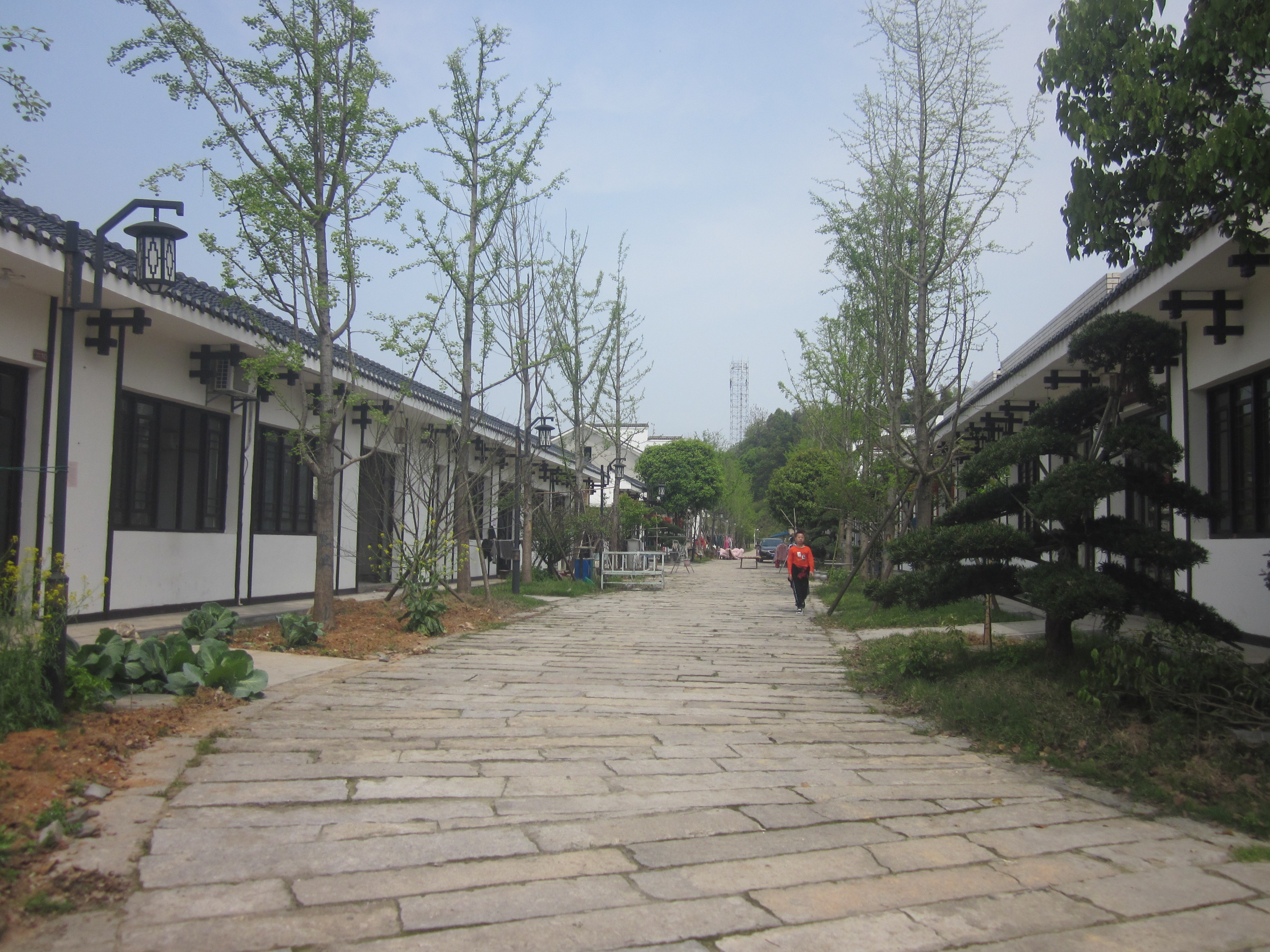
Libo Street

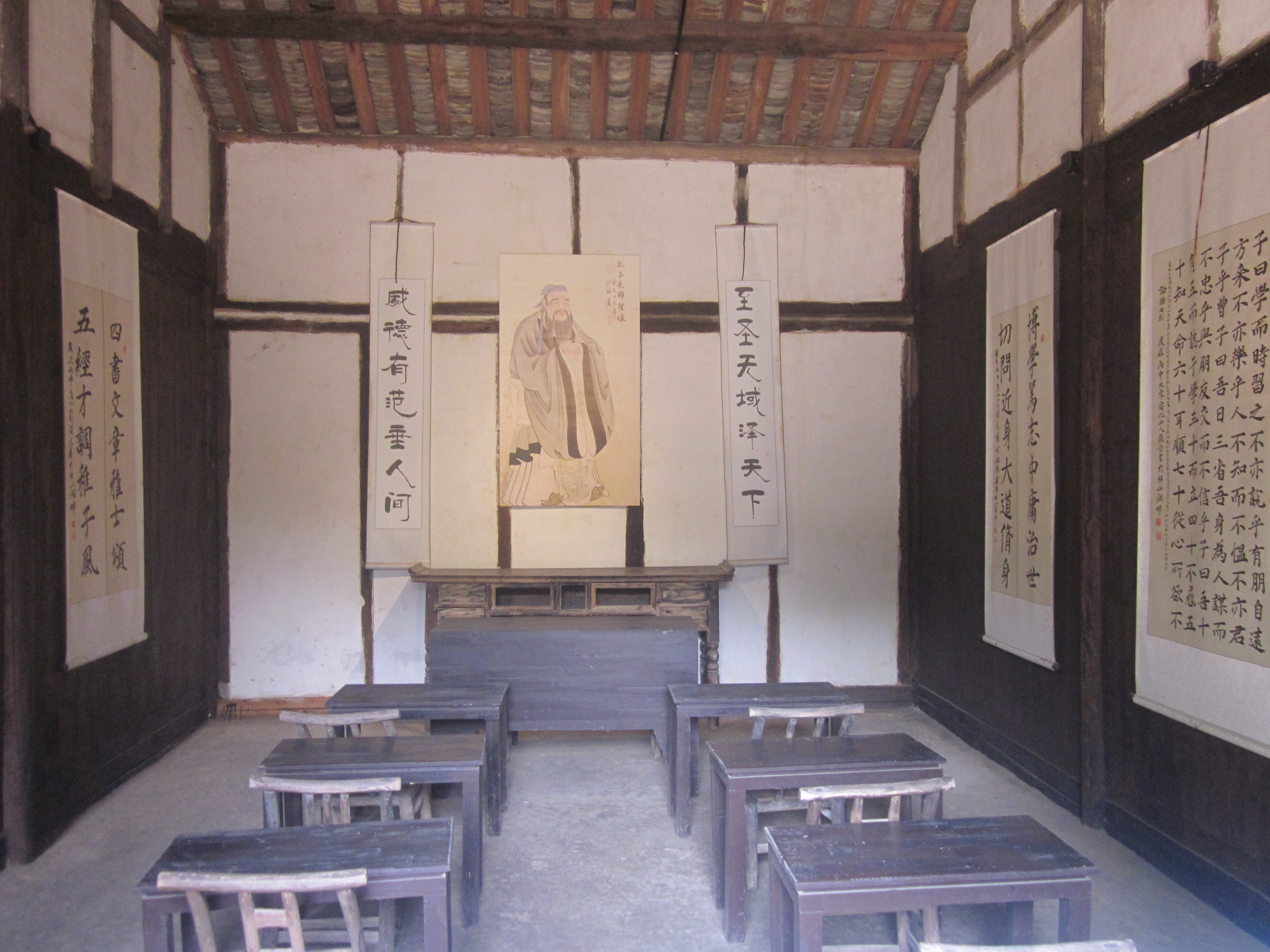
Interior of an old-style private school

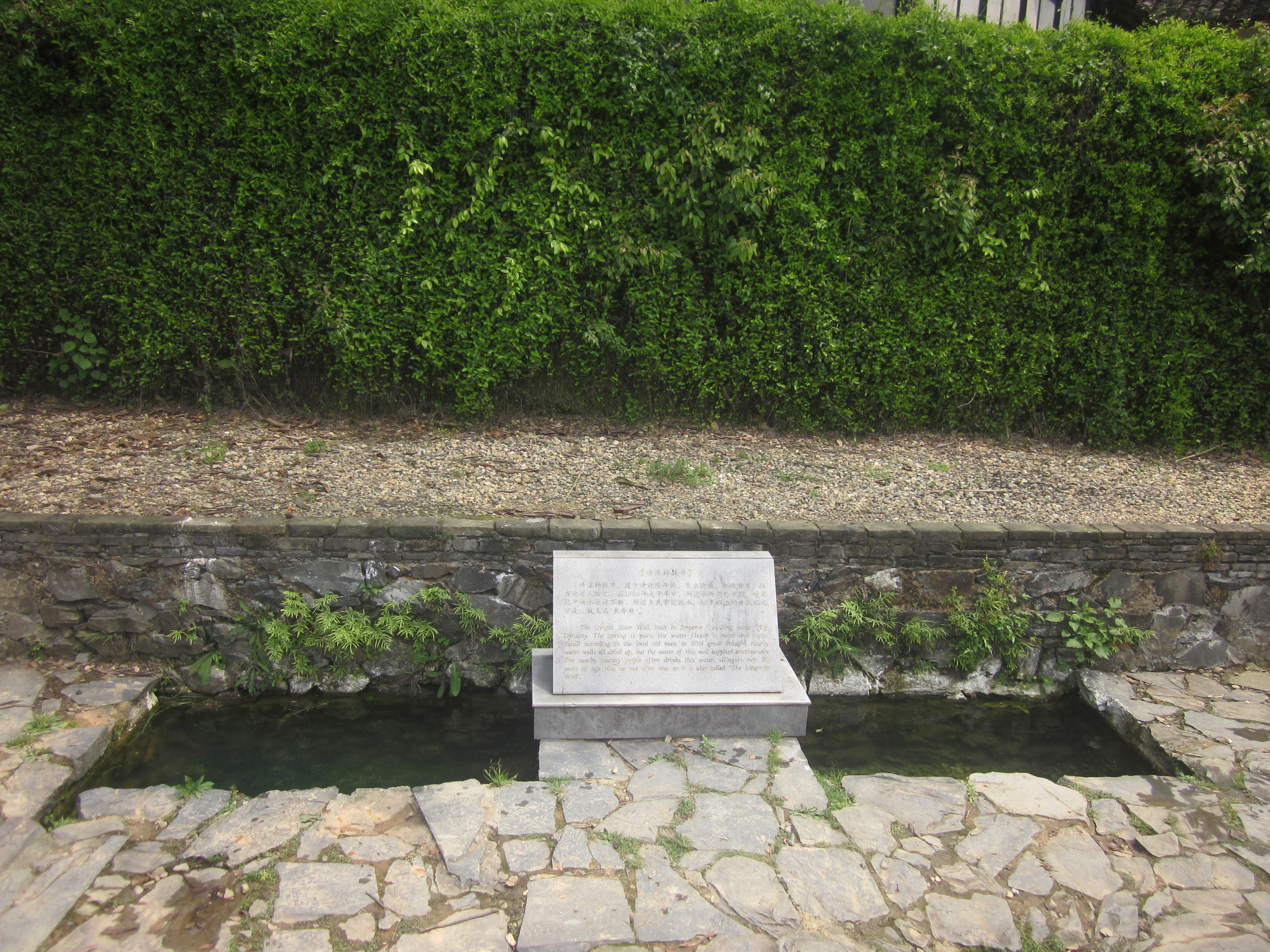
Qingxi Sister Well
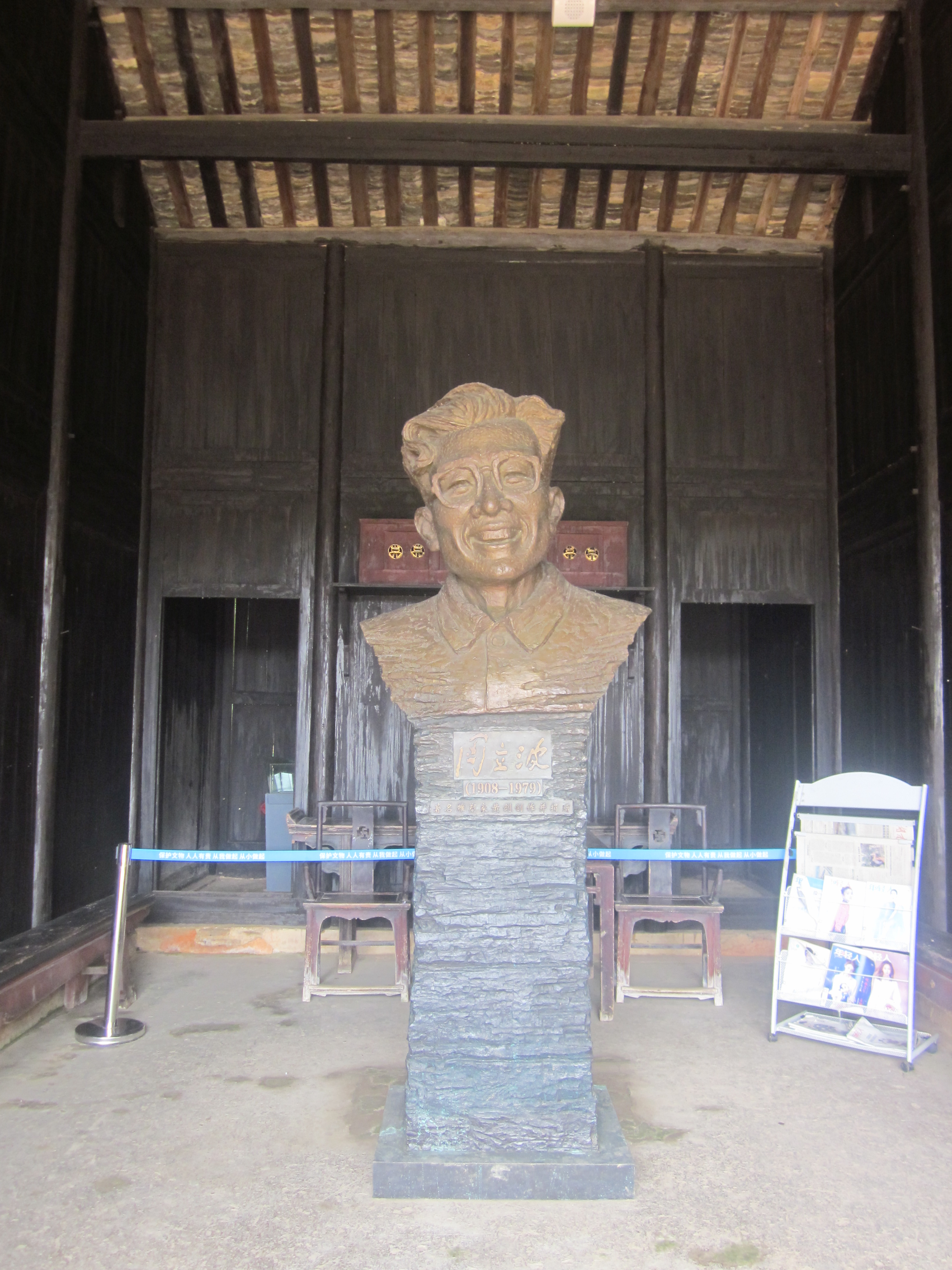
Statue of Zhou Libo at the central room.

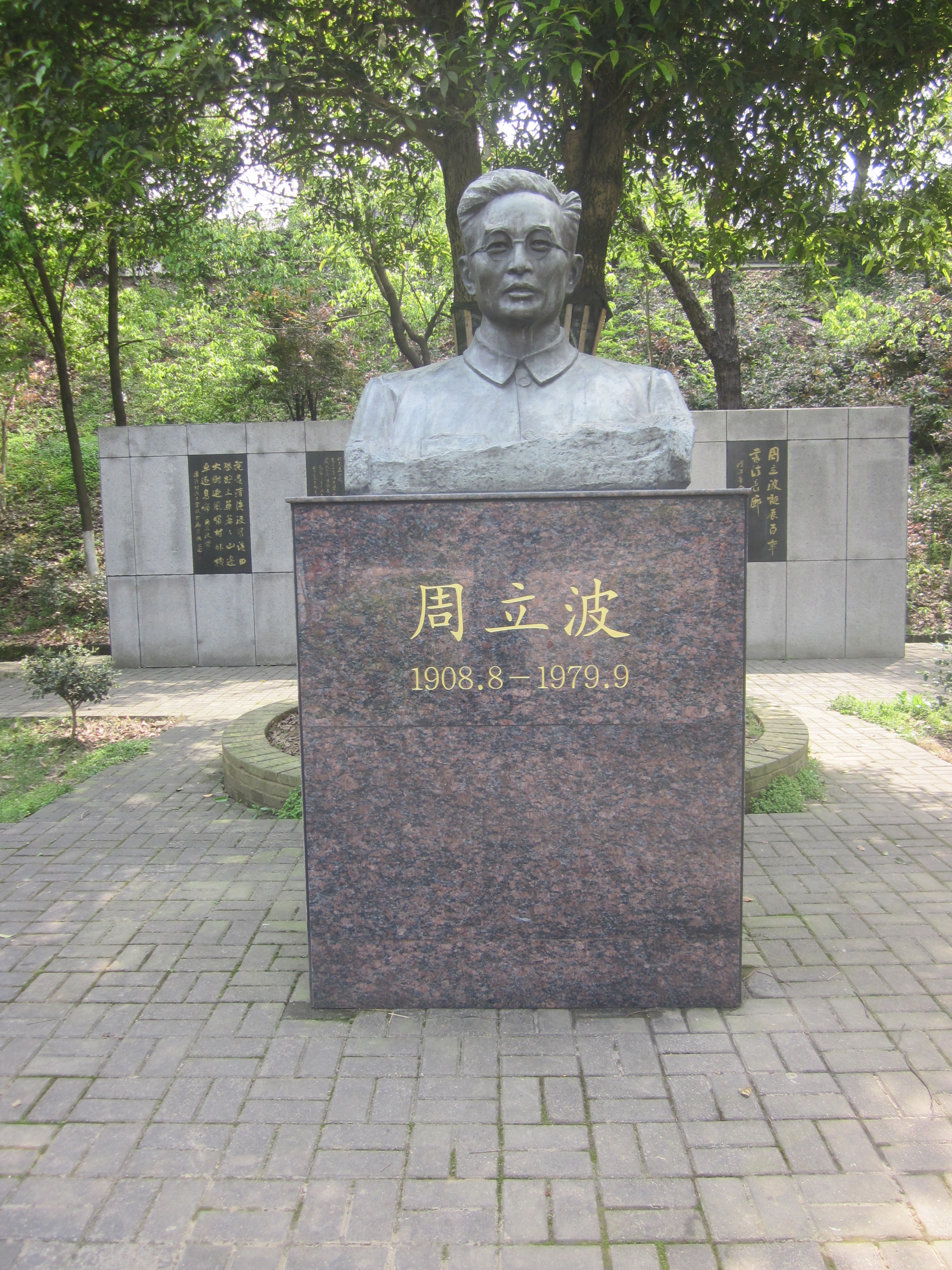
Statue of Zhou Libo
