= Mingshantou =

Mingshantou Town 明山头镇
- Town
- Location in Hunan
- Coordinates: 29°18′09″N 112°32′53″E
- Country: People's Republic of China
- Province: Hunan
- Prefecture-level city: Yiyang
- County: Nan

Area
  - Total: 64 km^{2} (25 sq mi)

Population
  - Total: 40,700
  - Density: 640/km^{2} (1,600/sq mi)
- Time zone: UTC+8 (China Standard)
- Area code: 0737

Mingshantou Town (simplified Chinese: 明山头镇; traditional Chinese: 明山頭鎮; pinyin: Míngshāntóu Zhèn) is an urban town in Nan County, Hunan Province, People's Republic of China.

== Administrative divisions ==
The town is divided into 20 villages and 2 communities, which include the following areas: Xincun Community, Chuangye Community, Mingshan Village, Damuqiao Village, Hongwei Village, Chuangye Village, Jianshang Village, Lixin Village, Limin Village, Yongfeng Village, Sixin Village, Shuhe Village, Nandou Village, Siqiaogong Village, Pingfu Village, Feng'an Village, Heyuan Village, Huzikou Village, Xiaogang Village, and Hufeng Village (新村社区、创业社区、明山村、大木桥村、红卫村、创业村、建商村、立新村、立民村、永丰村、永强村、永胜村、四新村、疏河村、南豆刂村、四千弓村、平伏村、丰安村、合垸村、湖子口村、小港村、护丰村).
