= Heba, Nan County =

Heba Town 河坝镇
- Town
- Location in Hunan
- Coordinates: 29°11′22″N 112°38′27″E
- Country: People's Republic of China
- Province: Hunan
- Prefecture-level city: Yiyang
- County: Nan

Area
  - Total: 28.2 km^{2} (10.9 sq mi)

Population
  - Total: 18,300
  - Density: 649/km^{2} (1,680/sq mi)
- Time zone: UTC+8 (China Standard)
- Area code: 0737

Heba Town (simplified Chinese: 河坝镇; traditional Chinese: 河壩鎮; pinyin: Hébà Zhèn) is an urban town in Nan County, Yiyang, Hunan Province, People's Republic of China.

== Administrative divisions ==
The town is divided into 25 villages and 3 communities, which include the following areas: Jinshan Community, Yinhe Community, Yinhai Community, Xinshan Village, Laohekou Village, Xinxiu Village, Xinyue Village, Yunhu Village, Yunzhouzi Village, Yunjing Village, Yunxiang Village, Yunmei Village, Sancaiyuan Village, Sanyuan Village, Sanguang Village, Wangjiahu Village, Wangye Village, Sanxing Village, Nongwu Village, Nonggu Village, Nongfeng Village, Nongfeng Village, Nongdeng Village, Nongleyuan Village, Hewan Village, Hezhong Village, Heyi Village, Hexinzhou Village, and Mingxin Village (金山社区、银河社区、银海社区、新山村、老河口村、新秀村、新月村、芸湖村、芸洲子村、芸景村、芸象村、芸美村、三财垸村、三源村、三广村、王家湖村、王业村、三兴村、农五村、农谷村、农丰村、农登村、农乐垸村、河万村、河众村、河一村、河心洲村、铭新村).
