= Yuxingshan Reservoir =

Reservoir in Hunan, China

- 鱼形山水库 (Chinese)
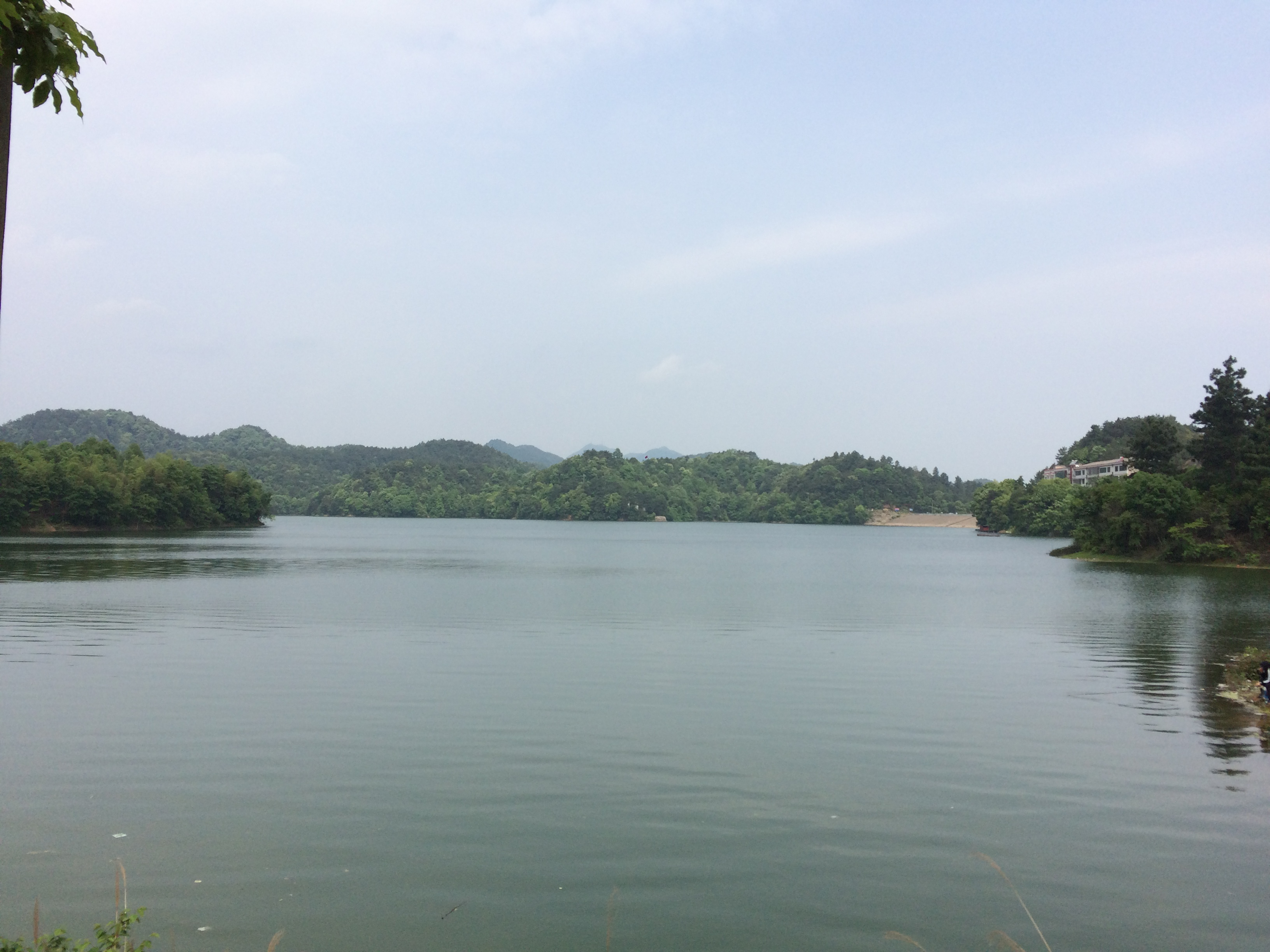
- Yuxingshan Reservoir.

- Location within Hunan
- Location: Cangshuipu Town, Heshan District, Yiyang, Hunan
- Coordinates: 28°24′34.08″N 112°26′08.55″E
- Type: Reservoir
- Basin countries: China
- Built: 1960s
- First flooded: 1960s
- Surface area: 2,800,000 m^{2} (30,000,000 sq ft)
- Water volume: 2,500 m^{3} (6.0×10^{−7} cu mi)

The Yuxingshan Reservoir (simplified Chinese: 鱼形山水库; traditional Chinese: 魚形山水庫; pinyin: Yúxíngshān Shuǐkù) is a medium-sized reservoir located in Cangshuipu Town of Heshan District, Yiyang, in northern Hunan in the southern China. It covers a total surface area of 2,800,000 m^{2} (30,000,000 sq ft) and has a storage capacity of some 2,500 m^{3} (6.0×10^{−7} cu mi) of water.

== History ==
The Yuxingshan Reservoir was constructed in the late 1960s by the local government for irrigation purposes.

== Public access ==
The Yuxingshan Reservoir is open to public on all day.

The reservoir provides an attractive setting for many outdoor activities, including fishing, hiking, pleasure boating, and water skiing.
