= Beizhouzi =

Beizhouzi Town 北洲子镇
- Town
- Location in Hunan
- Coordinates: 29°09′49″N 112°40′52″E
- Country: People's Republic of China
- Province: Hunan
- Prefecture-level city: Yiyang
- County: Nan County

Area
  - Total: 44.8 km^{2} (17.3 sq mi)

Population
  - Total: 14,900
  - Density: 333/km^{2} (861/sq mi)
- Time zone: UTC+8 (China Standard)
- Area code: 0737

Beizhouzi Town (simplified Chinese: 北洲子镇; traditional Chinese: 北洲子鎮; pinyin: Běizhōuzǐ Zhèn) is an urban town in Nan County, Yiyang, Hunan Province, People's Republic of China.

== Administrative divisions ==
The town is divided into 14 villages and 2 communities, which include the following areas: Hongfa Community, Yinhui Community, Xiangdong Village, Shunhe Village, Baili Village, Kewang Village, Changhu Village, Yongxing Village, Mapai Village, Donghong Village, Xiangyang Village, Minle Village, Longhe Village, Dawan Village, Zhongling Village, and Beisheng Village (宏发社区、银辉社区、向东村、顺河村、百利村、科旺村、长湖村、永兴村、马排村、东红村、向阳村、民乐村、龙河村、大湾村、中岭村、北胜村).
