= Sanxianhu =

Sanxianhu Town 三仙湖镇
- Town
- Location in Hunan
- Coordinates: 29°09′43″N 112°20′22″E
- Country: People's Republic of China
- Province: Hunan
- Prefecture-level city: Yiyang
- County: Nan

Area
  - Total: 37 km^{2} (14 sq mi)

Population
  - Total: 29,000
  - Density: 780/km^{2} (2,000/sq mi)
- Time zone: UTC+8 (China Standard)
- Area code: 0737

Sanxianhu Town (simplified Chinese: 三仙湖镇; traditional Chinese: 三仙湖鎮; pinyin: Sānxiānhú Zhèn) is an urban town in Nan County, Hunan Province, People's Republic of China.

== Administrative divisions ==
The town is divided into 27 villages and 3 communities, which include the following areas: Jianshejie Community, Xinminjie Community, Chaimatoujie Community, Xiantai Village, Changhong Village, Junhe Village, Jiaqing Village, Taixing Village, Feiyue Village, Xingzhou Village, Shengli Village, Tiaoxuhu Village, Xiaozhou Village, Shiba Village, Xinlian Village, Junfeng Village, Chenzihu Village, Zhongqi Village, Liqun Village, Shangchai Village, Xiachai Village, Changzhou Village, Jifu Village, Wanyuan Village, Zhenhe Village, Baofu Village, Changxing Village, Guandimiao Village, Weiyu Village, and Duofu Village (建设街社区、新民街社区、柴码头街社区、咸太村、长虹村、均和村、加庆村、太星村、飞跃村、兴洲村、胜利村、调蓄湖村、小洲村、石坝村、新联村、均丰村、陈子湖村、中奇村、利群村、上柴村、下柴村、常洲村、集伏村、万元村、贞和村、保伏村、长兴村、关帝庙村、渭育村、多福村).
