= White Deer Temple =

Buddhist temple in Yiyang, Hunan, China

- 白鹿寺
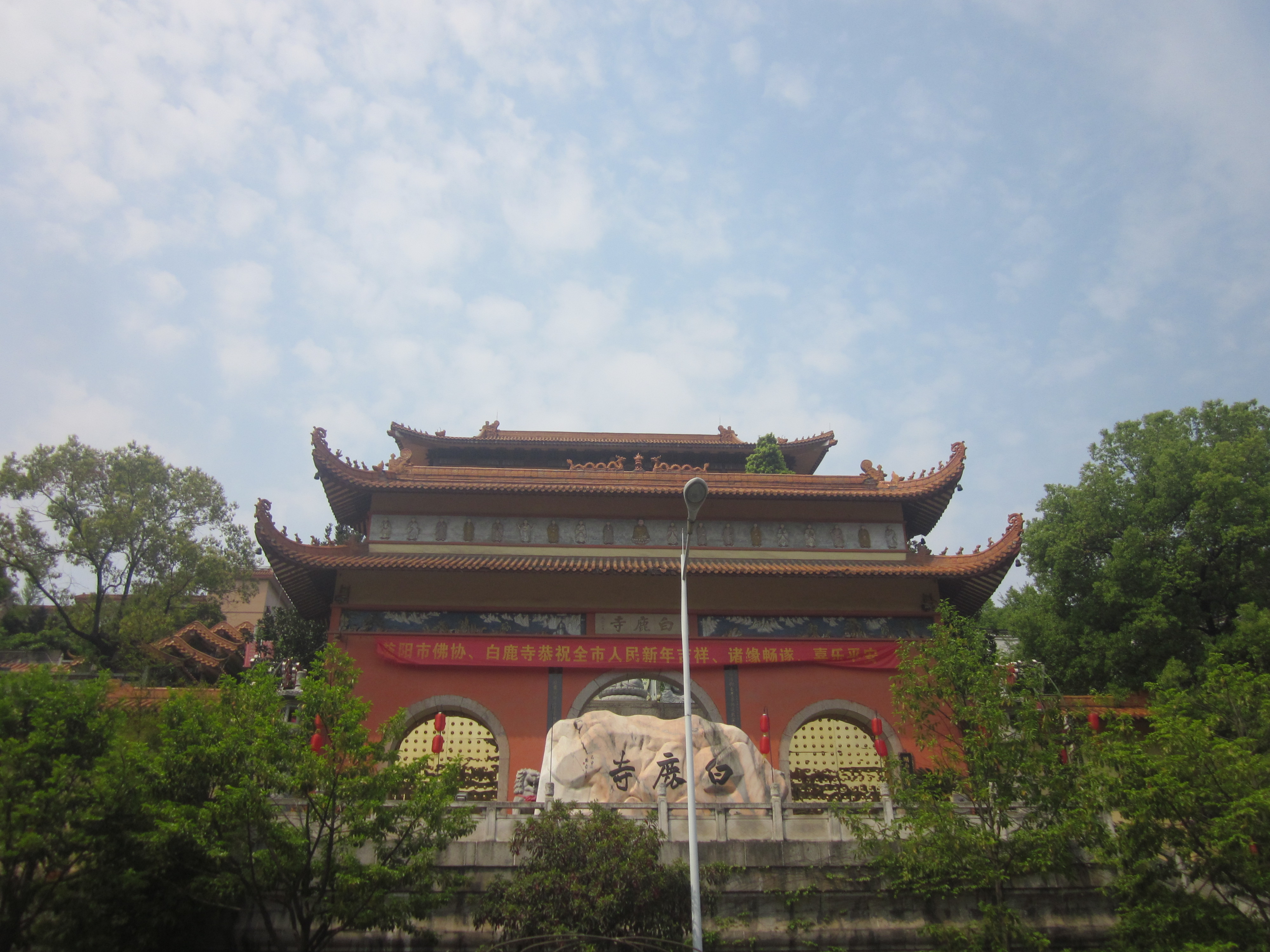
- Shanmen at White Deer Temple.

- Location within Hunan Location within China

Religion
- Affiliation: Buddhism
- Deity: Linji school

Location
- Location: Yiyang, Hunan, China
- Interactive map of White Deer Temple
- Coordinates: 28°35′20″N 112°20′27″E

Architecture
- Style: Chinese architecture
- Established: 806–820
- Completed: 2003 (reconstruction)

White Deer Temple (Chinese: 白鹿寺; pinyin: Báilù Sì) is a Buddhist temple located on the south bank of Zi River in Yiyang, Hunan, China.

== History ==
White Deer Temple was originally built in the Yuanhe era (806–820) of the Tang dynasty (618–907).

In 1858, in the 8th year of Xianfeng period of the Qing dynasty (1644–1911), most of the temple buildings were badly damaged by the Taiping Rebellion. After war, with the support of Tao Zhu, the then Viceroy of Liangjiang, Chan master Weiguang (惟光) spent six years rebuilding the temple. In 1881, in the ruling of Guangxu Emperor, monk Haiyin (海印) resided in the temple.

In 1922, after he died, monk Zikong (自空) took over as abbot. After that, Zhuming (烛冥), Hongchang (弘畅), Yuanxiu (愿修), Xigu (熹谷), and Foyuan (佛源) served successively as abbots. In 1943, Hongchang founded Yiyang Buddhist Institute (益阳佛教讲习所) in the temple.

After the establishment of the Communist State, White Deer Temple was used as a factory. In 1958, the factory was merged into Yiyang People's Weaving Factory (益阳市人民织布厂). During the Cultural Revolution, the local government confiscated temple lands and forced monks to return to secular life. After the 3rd Plenary Session of the 11th Central Committee of the Chinese Communist Party, a policy of some religious freedom was implemented. The temple reactivated its religious activities. In 1984, the Yiyang Buddhist Association (益阳市佛教协会) was set up in the temple. The local government chose the Talin Mountain to build the new temple. Chan master Foyuan was invited by the local government as abbot. In the autumn of 1990, the Mahavira Hall was completed and was officially open to the public. In the next five years, Hall of Guanyin, Hall of Guru, Hall of Bhaisajyaguru, and Dharma Hall were added to the temple.

== Architecture ==
White Deer Temple was built along the up and down of Talin Mountain (塔林山) and divided into the central, east and west routes. Now the complex include the following halls: Shanmen, Mahavira Hall, Jade Buddha Hall, Hall of Bhaisajyaguru, Hall of Guanyin, Bell tower, Drum tower, Hall of Guru, Dharma Hall, Dining Room, etc.

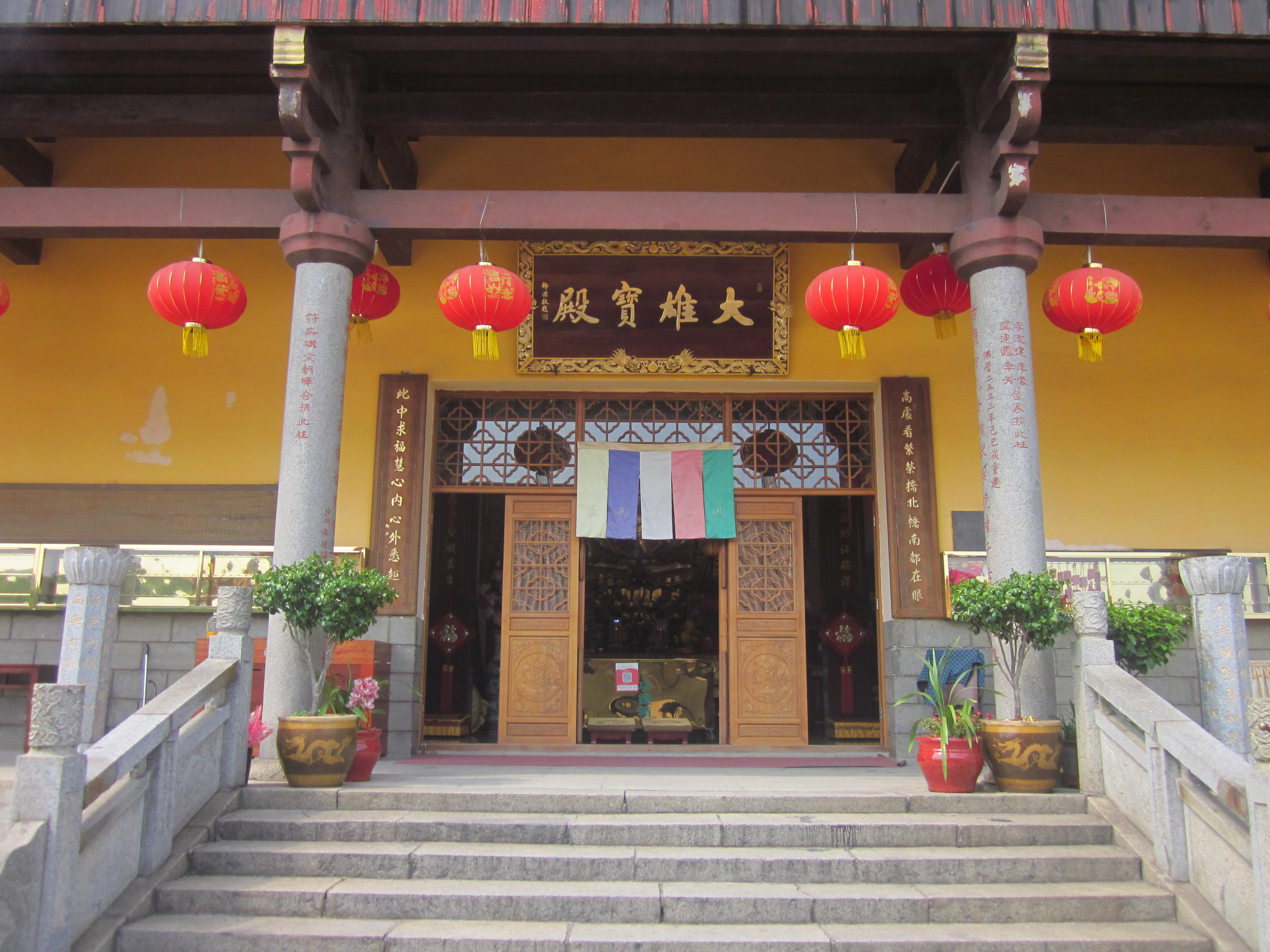
Mahavira Hall

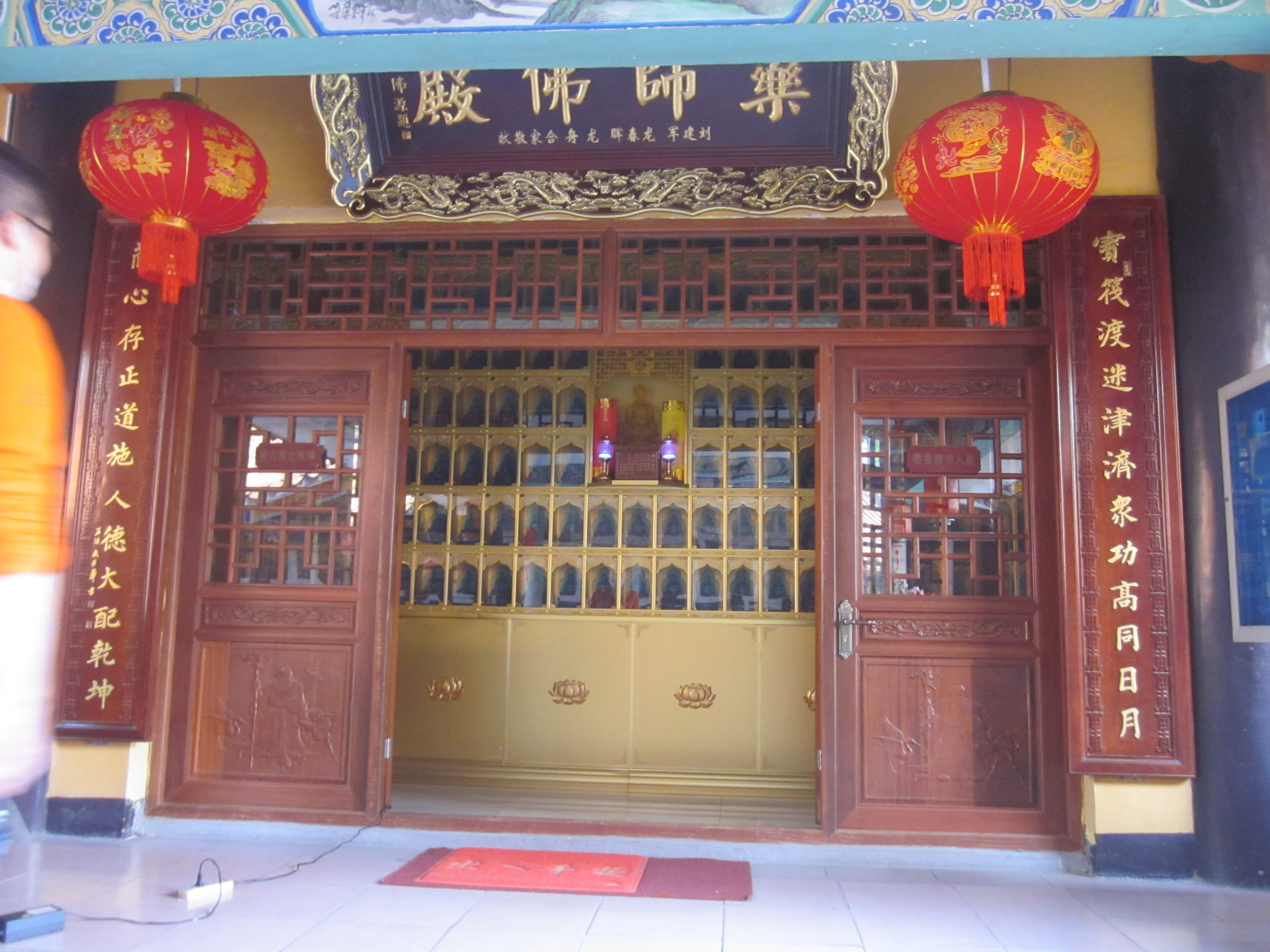
Hall of Bhaisajyaguru

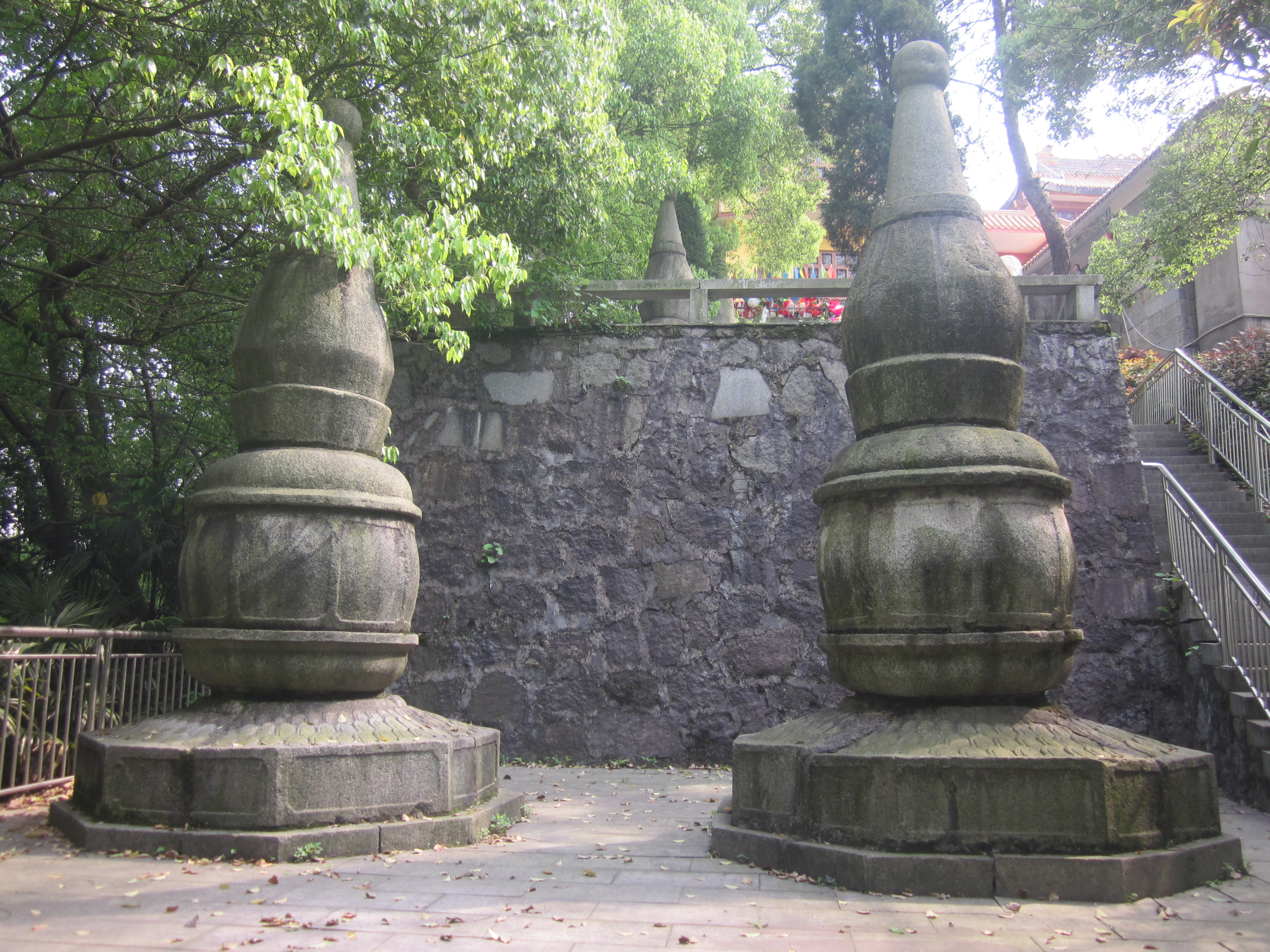
Stupas
