= Mahekou, Nan County =

Mahekou Town 麻河口镇
- Town
- Location in Hunan
- Coordinates: 29°17′51″N 112°16′14″E
- Country: People's Republic of China
- Province: Hunan
- Prefecture-level city: Yiyang
- County: Nan County

Area
  - Total: 42 km^{2} (16 sq mi)

Population
  - Total: 26,000
  - Density: 620/km^{2} (1,600/sq mi)
- Time zone: UTC+8 (China Standard)
- Area code: 0737

Mahekou Town (simplified Chinese: 麻河口镇; traditional Chinese: 麻河口鎮; pinyin: Máhékǒu Zhèn) is an urban town in Nan County, Hunan Province, People's Republic of China.

== Administrative divisions ==
The town is divided into 35 villages and 2 communities, which include the following areas: Fanggu Community, Beihekou Community, Tieluxiang Village, Xikou Village, Jiubaigong Village, Qianzihong Village, Yinzhutan Village, Deheyuan Village, Yanzhijia Village, Quan'anyuan Village, Chongkou Village, Caijiapu Village, Gaojiazhou Village, Zishanhe Village, Quanmeidou Village, Jinjiapu Village, Shanjiazhou Village, Chenjia Village, Pianyuan Village, Wanzi Village, Qianhong Village, Xianhua Village, Xiangyang Village, Majia Village, Fujia Village, Dongsheng Village, Guangyue Village, Guanghong Village, Daba Village, Shangzhou Village, Guangzheng Village, Ronghu Village, Jianshe Village, Jianxin Village, Caojiapu Village, and Zhaohegang Village (方谷社区、北河口社区、铁芦巷村、西口村、九百弓村、六百弓村、千紫红村、银珠潭村、德和垸村、胭脂浃村、全安垸村、冲口村、蔡家铺村、高家洲村、子山河村、全美剅村、金家铺村、沈家洲村、陈家村、偏垸村、万紫村、千红村、鲜花村、向阳村、马家村、付家村、东胜村、光跃村、光红村、大坝村、上洲村、光正村、荣湖村、建设村、建新村、曹家辅村、兆和岗村).
