= Qingshuzui =

Qingshuzui Town 青树嘴镇
- Town
- Location in Hunan
- Coordinates: 29°13′07″N 112°23′43″E
- Country: People's Republic of China
- Province: Hunan
- Prefecture-level city: Yiyang
- County: Nan

Area
  - Total: 71 km^{2} (27 sq mi)

Population
  - Total: 46,000
  - Density: 650/km^{2} (1,700/sq mi)
- Time zone: UTC+8 (China Standard)
- Area code: 0737

Qingshuzui Town (simplified Chinese: 青树嘴镇; traditional Chinese: 青樹嘴鎮; pinyin: Qīngshùzuǐ Zhèn) is an urban town in Nan County, Hunan Province, People's Republic of China.

== Administrative divisions ==
The town is divided into 26 villages and 1 community, which include the following areas: Qingshuzui Community, Jinhua Village, Weiyong Village, Yifeng Village, Liuhe Village, Quanxin Village, Dongbentang Village, Baihetang Village, Simei Village, Bayi Village, Fulitang Village, Qinghe Village, Qingshu Village, Renshou Village, Binhu Village, Xinyue Village, Xinjian Village, Xin'an Village, Xinxiang Village, Xinhu Village, Shuangzha Village, Yongkang Village, Changle Village, Weixing Village, Nongxue Village, Nongfeng Village, and Haomin Village (青树嘴社区、金华村、卫拥村、益丰村、六合村、全新村、东本堂村、白鹤堂村、四美村、八一村、福利堂村、清和村、青树村、仁寿村、滨湖村、新跃村、新建村、新安村、新湘村、新湖村、双闸村、永康村、长乐村、卫星村、农学村、农丰村、浩民村).
