= Wuzui =

Wuzui Township 乌嘴乡
- Township
- Location in Hunan
- Coordinates: 29°18′18″N 112°28′24″E
- Country: People's Republic of China
- Province: Hunan
- Prefecture-level city: Yiyang
- County: Nan

Area
  - Total: 69.56 km^{2} (26.86 sq mi)

Population
  - Total: 39,600
  - Density: 569/km^{2} (1,470/sq mi)
- Time zone: UTC+8 (China Standard)
- Area code: 0737

Wuzui Township (simplified Chinese: 乌嘴乡; traditional Chinese: 烏嘴鄉; pinyin: Wūzuǐ Xiāng) is a rural township in Nan County, Hunan Province, People's Republic of China.

== Administrative divisions ==
The township is divided into 20 villages and 1 community, which include the following areas: Zhaoming Community, Xinzhou Village, Xinli Village, Xinmin Village, Dongcheng Village, Chaoxi Village, Dayuan Village, Gangkou Village, Chaoqian Village, Qunfeng Village, Jiaozui Village, Dongge Village, Baimo Village, Niuchang Village, Luowen Village, Donghe Village, Sainan Village, Dongnan Village, Wenjia Village, Changchun Village, and Anle Village (昭明社区、新洲村、新立村、新民村、东成村、朝锡村、大垸村、港口村、朝前村、群峰村、窑嘴村、东阁村、白沫村、牛场村、罗文村、东河村、赛南村、东南村、文家村、长春村、安乐村).
