= Heshan Subdistrict, Yiyang =

Subdistrict in Hunan, China

Coordinates: 28°35′43″N 112°21′43″E

Heshan Subdistrict (Chinese: 赫山街道; pinyin: Hèshān Jiēdào) is a subdistrict and the seat of Heshan District in Yiyang Prefecture-level City, Hunan, China. The subdistrict was reformed through the amalgamation of Longguangqiao Township (Chinese: 龙光桥镇) and the former Heshan Subdistrict on November 26, 2015. It has an area of 126.98 km^{2} (49.03 sq mi) with a population of 145,500 (as of 2010 census).
