= Nanzhou, Nan County =

Nanzhou Town 南洲镇
- Town
- Location in Hunan
- Coordinates: 29°22′17″N 112°23′04″E
- Country: People's Republic of China
- Province: Hunan
- Prefecture-level city: Yiyang
- County: Nan

Area
  - Total: 47.9 km^{2} (18.5 sq mi)

Population
  - Total: 100,000
  - Density: 2,100/km^{2} (5,400/sq mi)
- Time zone: UTC+8 (China Standard)
- Area code: 0737

Nanzhou Town (simplified Chinese: 南洲镇; traditional Chinese: 南洲鎮; pinyin: Nánzhōu Zhèn) is an urban town and the seat of Nan County in Hunan, China.

== Administrative divisions ==
The town is divided into 25 villages and 9 communities, which include the following areas: Dongdiwei Community, Laozhengjie Community, Chisongting Community, Yong'an Community, Donghong Community, Huajiahu Community, Baotahu Community, Huojian Community, Xinhe Community, Xiaoheyan Village, Dingjiacheng Village, Dalangcheng Village, Dazhou Village, Nanzhou Village, Beiyang Village, Baimache Village, Shuangyan Village, Nanshan Village, Shentonggang Village, Bafangzui Village, Banzui Village, Qingminghu Village, Qingyunao Village, Huangjia Village, Hehua Village, Changxingqiao Village, Zhanggongtang Village, Xinyan Village, Yangjialing Village, Fumeiqiao Village, Heishushan Village, Shuyuan Village, Heishanpo Village, and Chaoyang Village (东堤尾社区、老正街社区、赤松亭社区、永安社区、东红社区、花甲湖社区、宝塔湖社区、火箭社区、新荷社区、小荷堰村、丁家城村、大郎城村、大洲村、南洲村、北洋村、白马圻村、双燕村、南山村、神童港村、八方嘴村、班嘴村、清明湖村、青鱼脑村、黄家村、荷花村、长兴桥村、张公塘村、新颜村、杨家岭村、伏美桥村、黑树山村、书院村、黑山坡村、朝阳村).
