= Nan County =

Nan County 南县
- County
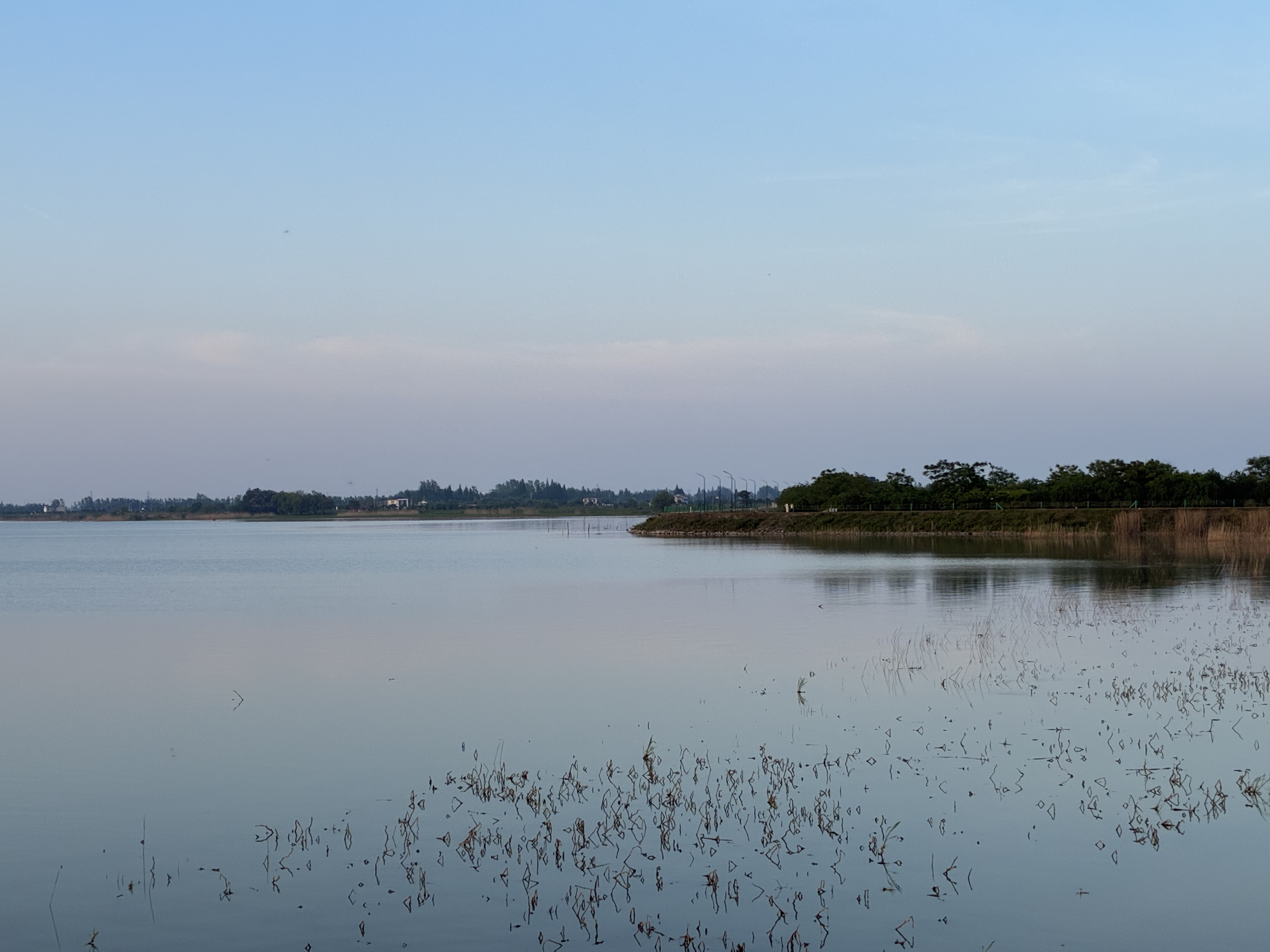

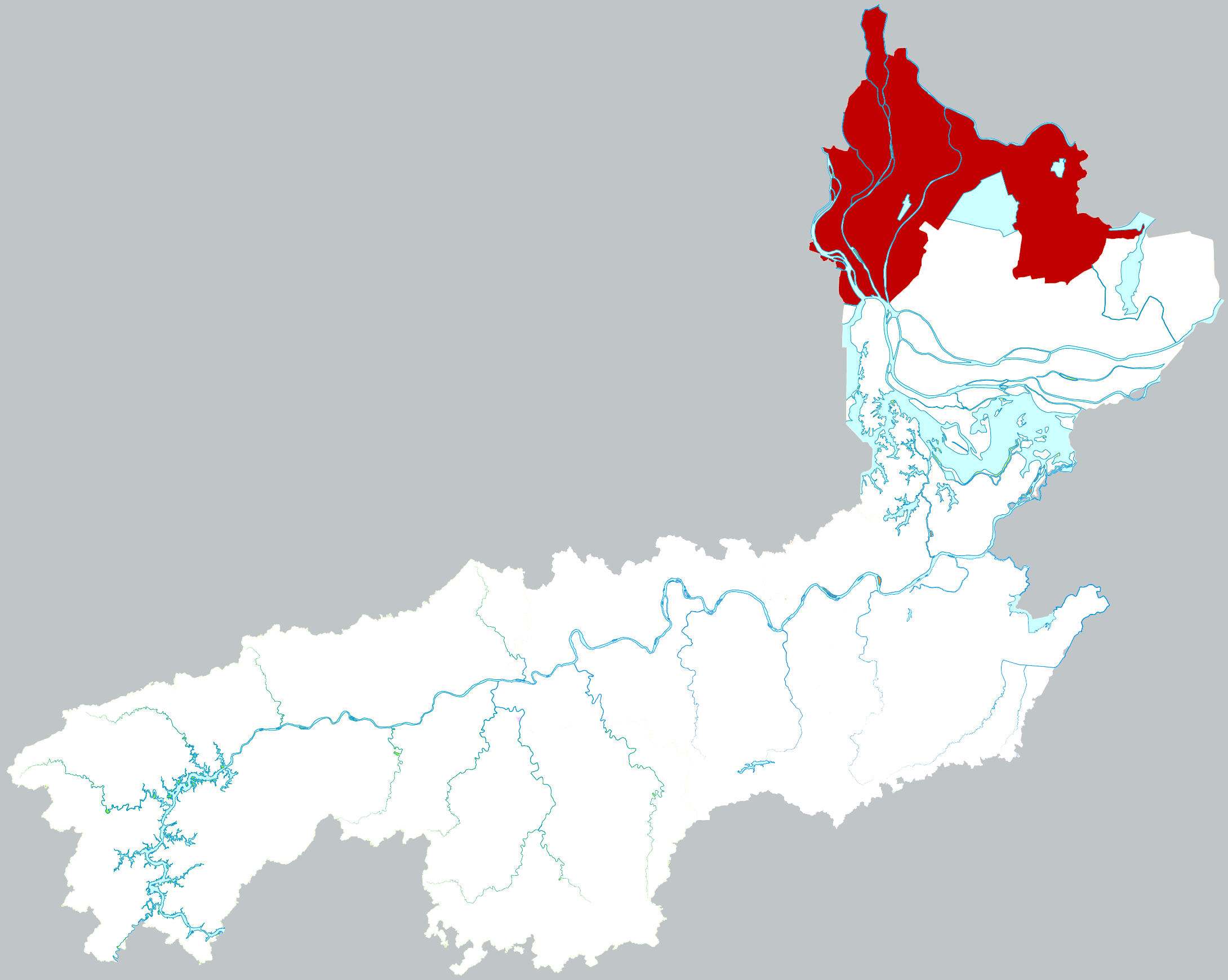
- Location of Nan County within Yiyang

- Location in Hunan Nanxian (China)
- Coordinates (Qingshuizui (青树嘴镇; 青樹嘴鎮)): 29°12′47″N 112°24′25″E
- Country: People's Republic of China
- Province: Hunan
- Prefecture-level city: Yiyang

Area
  - Total: 1,321 km^{2} (510 sq mi)

Population
  - Total: 725,562
  - Density: 549.3/km^{2} (1,423/sq mi)
- Time zone: UTC+8 (China Standard)

Nan County, or Nanxian (simplified Chinese: 南县; traditional Chinese: 南縣; pinyin: Nán Xiàn; lit. 'south county') is a county in the Province of Hunan, China. It is under the administration of the prefecture-level city of Yiyang.

Located in the northern margin of the province, the county is bordered to the north by Shishou City of Hubei, to the northeast by Huarong County, to the east by Yueyang County, to the south by Yuanjiang County, to the southwest by Hanshou County and Dingcheng District of Changde City, and to the northwest by Anxiang County. Nan County covers an area of 1,346.62 km^{2} (519.93 sq mi), and as of 2015, it had a registered population of 683,500 and a permanent resident population of 632,800. The county has 14 towns and 1 township under its jurisdiction, and the county seat is Nanzhou (南洲镇).

== Administrative divisions ==
Through the amalgamation of township-level divisions in Nan County on November 26, 2015, Nan County had 13 towns and 2 townships under its jurisdiction. In 2017, the township of Zhongyukou was reorganized as a town, the county has a township and 14 towns.

14 towns

- Beizhouzi (北洲子镇)
- Changjiao (厂窖镇)
- Heba (河坝镇): Merging Shabaozhou Town (沙堡洲镇) and the former Heba Town on November 26, 2015.
- Huage (华阁镇)
- Jinpen (金盆镇)
- Langbahu (浪拔湖镇)
- Mahekou (麻河口镇)
- Maocaojie (茅草街镇)
- Mingshantou (明山头镇)
- Nanzhou (南洲镇)
- Qingshuzui (青树嘴镇)
- Sanxianhu (三仙湖镇)
- Wushenggong (武圣宫镇)
- Zhongyukou (中鱼口镇)

a township

- Wuzui (乌嘴乡)

== Climate ==
Climate data for Nanxian, elevation 40 m (130 ft), (1991–2020 normals, extremes 1981–2010)
Month	Jan	Feb	Mar	Apr	May	Jun	Jul	Aug	Sep	Oct	Nov	Dec	Year
Record high °C (°F)	22.5 (72.5)	28.0 (82.4)	31.8 (89.2)	36.7 (98.1)	34.9 (94.8)	37.5 (99.5)	38.7 (101.7)	38.3 (100.9)	36.6 (97.9)	33.6 (92.5)	29.9 (85.8)	22.9 (73.2)	38.7 (101.7)
Mean daily maximum °C (°F)	8.3 (46.9)	11.2 (52.2)	15.7 (60.3)	22.0 (71.6)	26.7 (80.1)	29.8 (85.6)	32.6 (90.7)	32.0 (89.6)	28.1 (82.6)	23.0 (73.4)	16.9 (62.4)	10.9 (51.6)	21.4 (70.6)
Daily mean °C (°F)	4.9 (40.8)	7.5 (45.5)	11.7 (53.1)	17.7 (63.9)	22.5 (72.5)	26.0 (78.8)	28.8 (83.8)	28.1 (82.6)	23.9 (75.0)	18.5 (65.3)	12.8 (55.0)	7.2 (45.0)	17.5 (63.4)
Mean daily minimum °C (°F)	2.3 (36.1)	4.6 (40.3)	8.7 (47.7)	14.3 (57.7)	19.2 (66.6)	23.0 (73.4)	25.8 (78.4)	25.1 (77.2)	20.7 (69.3)	15.4 (59.7)	9.7 (49.5)	4.4 (39.9)	14.4 (58.0)
Record low °C (°F)	−8.1 (17.4)	−4.8 (23.4)	−1.4 (29.5)	2.0 (35.6)	9.9 (49.8)	13.0 (55.4)	19.2 (66.6)	16.4 (61.5)	10.6 (51.1)	3.4 (38.1)	−1.3 (29.7)	−6.8 (19.8)	−8.1 (17.4)
Average precipitation mm (inches)	58.1 (2.29)	70.6 (2.78)	106.5 (4.19)	158.0 (6.22)	165.8 (6.53)	185.2 (7.29)	165.4 (6.51)	114.4 (4.50)	69.1 (2.72)	80.4 (3.17)	73.8 (2.91)	33.5 (1.32)	1,280.8 (50.43)
Average precipitation days (≥ 0.1 mm)	11.1	11.4	14.4	13.7	13.8	13.3	10.1	9.6	8.0	10.2	9.7	8.6	133.9
Average snowy days	4.4	2.8	0.7	0	0	0	0	0	0	0	0.1	1.8	9.8
Average relative humidity (%)	76	76	78	77	77	80	79	80	78	76	76	73	77
Mean monthly sunshine hours	70.7	70.7	93.1	119.6	139.1	133.9	198.1	195.9	143.0	123.5	109.7	97.8	1,495.1
Percentage possible sunshine	22	22	25	31	33	32	47	48	39	35	35	31	33
Source: China Meteorological Administration
