= Heshan, Yiyang =

Heshan 赫山区
- District
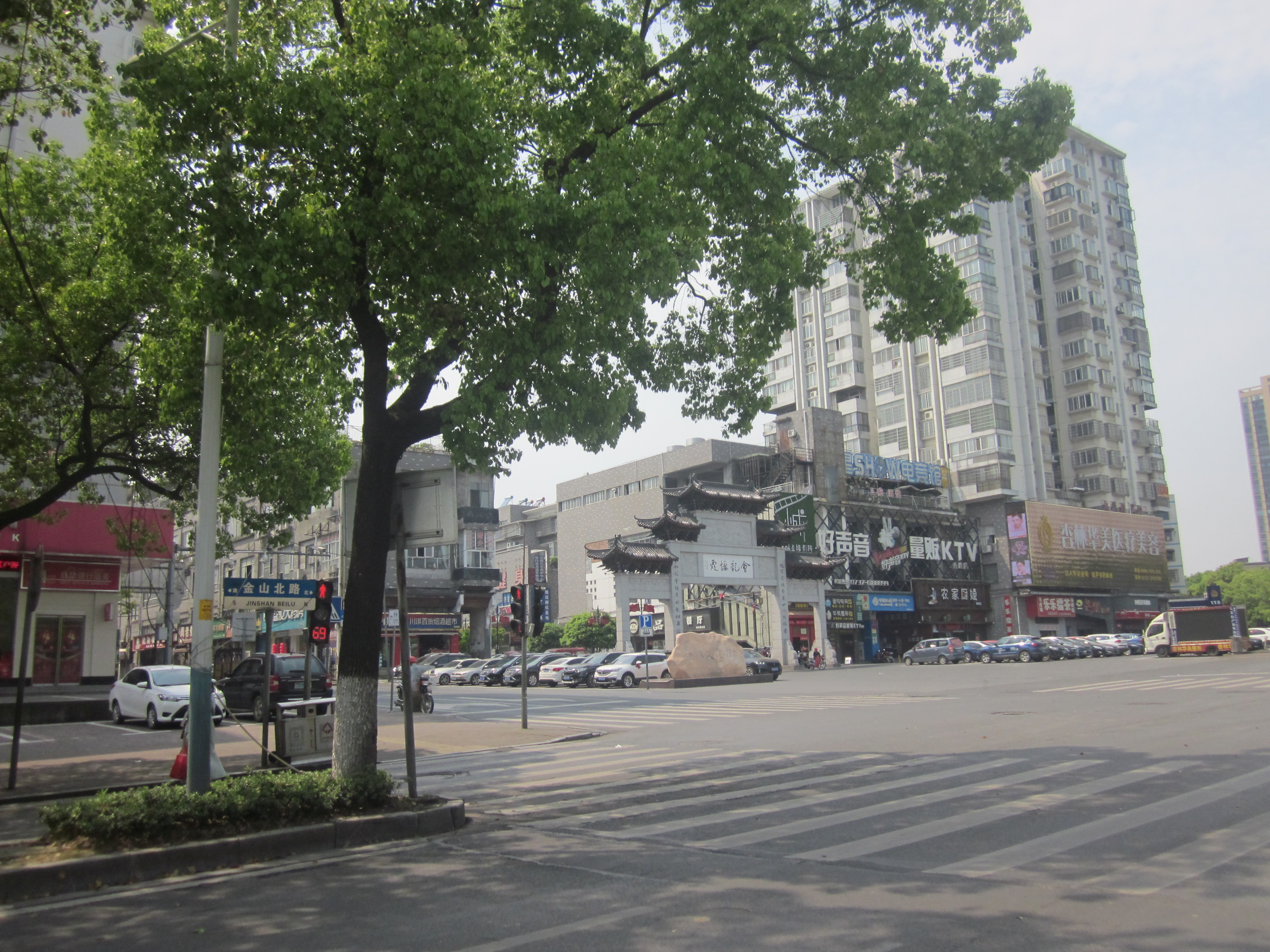

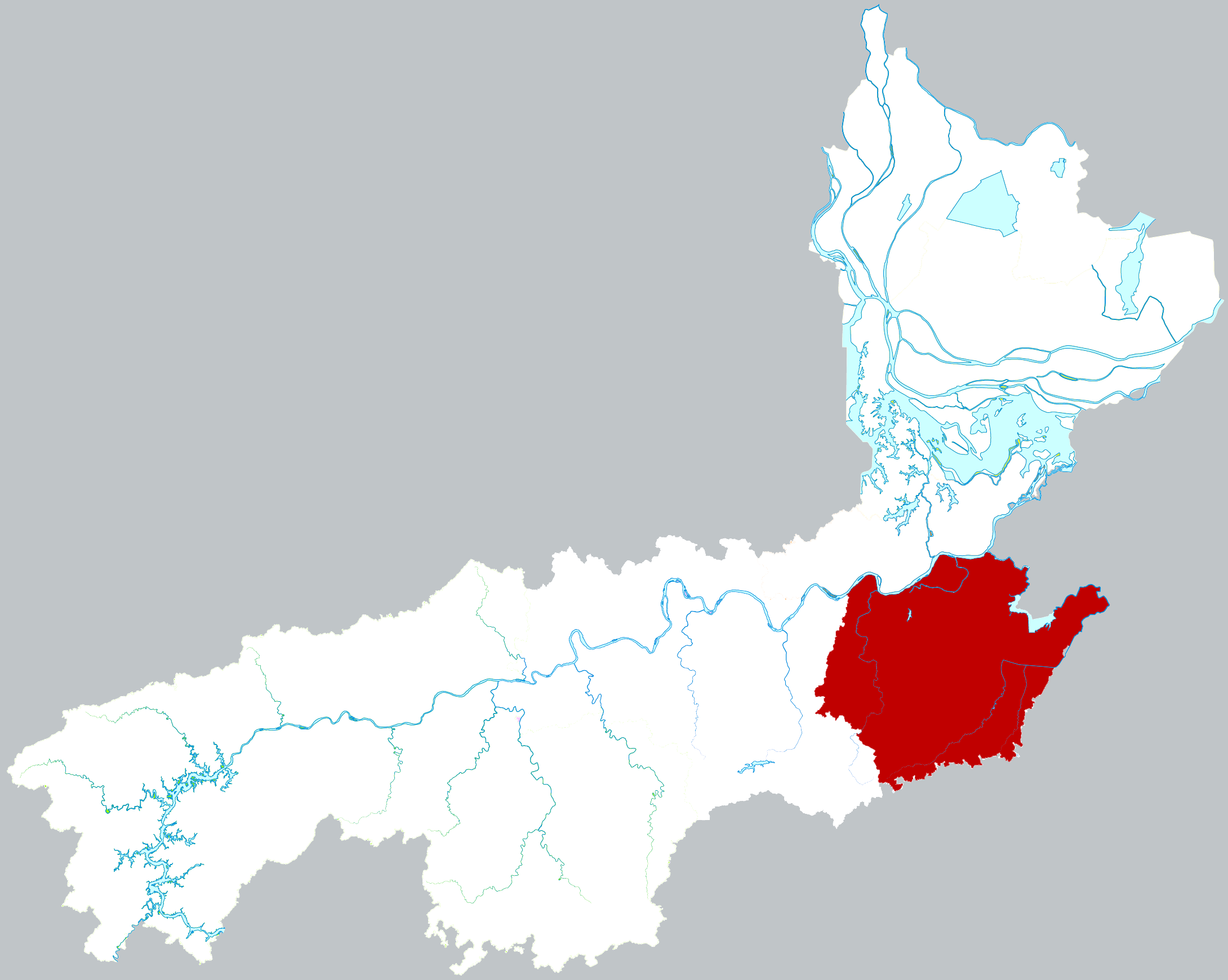
- Location of Heshan District within Yiyang

- Location in Hunan Heshan (China)
- Coordinates: 28°27′53″N 112°27′59″E
- Country: China
- Province: Hunan
- Prefecture-level city: Yiyang
- District seat: Heshan Subdistrict

Area
  - Total: 1,280 km^{2} (490 sq mi)

Population (2020 census)
  - Total: 889,068
  - Density: 695/km^{2} (1,800/sq mi)
- Time zone: UTC+8 (China Standard)
- Website: www.hnhs.gov.cn

Heshan District (simplified Chinese: 赫山区; traditional Chinese: 赫山區; pinyin: Hèshān Qū) is one of two districts in Yiyang City, Hunan Province, China. It is also the most populous district in the province.

The district is located on the southern bank of Zi River, the Xiang River runs away on the eastern margin. It is bordered to the north by Ziyang District, to the east by Xiangyin County, to the south by Wangcheng District of Changsha and Ningxiang City, to the west by Taojiang County.

Heshan District covers an area of 1,278 km^{2} (493 sq mi), as of 2015, it had a registered population of 920,000. The county has 6 subdistricts, 10 towns and a township under its jurisdiction. The government seat is Hongjiacun (洪家村社区).

== Administrative divisions ==
Heshan District has 6 subdistricts, 9 towns and 1 township under its jurisdictions.

6 subdistricts

- Heshan Subdistrict (赫山街道)
- Taohualun Subdistrict (桃花仑街道)
- Jinyinshan Subdistrict (金银山街道)
- Huilongshan Subdistrict (会龙山街道)
- Yuxingshan Subdistrict (鱼形山街道)
- Longguangqiao Subdistrict (龙光桥街道)

9 towns

- Bazishao (八字哨镇)
- Quanjiaohe (泉交河镇)
- Oujiangcha (欧江岔镇)
- Cangshuipu (沧水铺镇)
- Yuejiaqiao (岳家桥镇)
- Xinshidu (新市渡镇)
- Lanxi (兰溪镇)
- Henglunqiao (衡龙桥镇)
- Nijiangkou (泥江口镇)

1 township

- Bijiashan Township (笔架山乡)

== Tourist attractions ==
The Former Residence of Zhou Libo is a popular attraction.
