= Zhou Libo (writer) =

Chinese novelist and translator

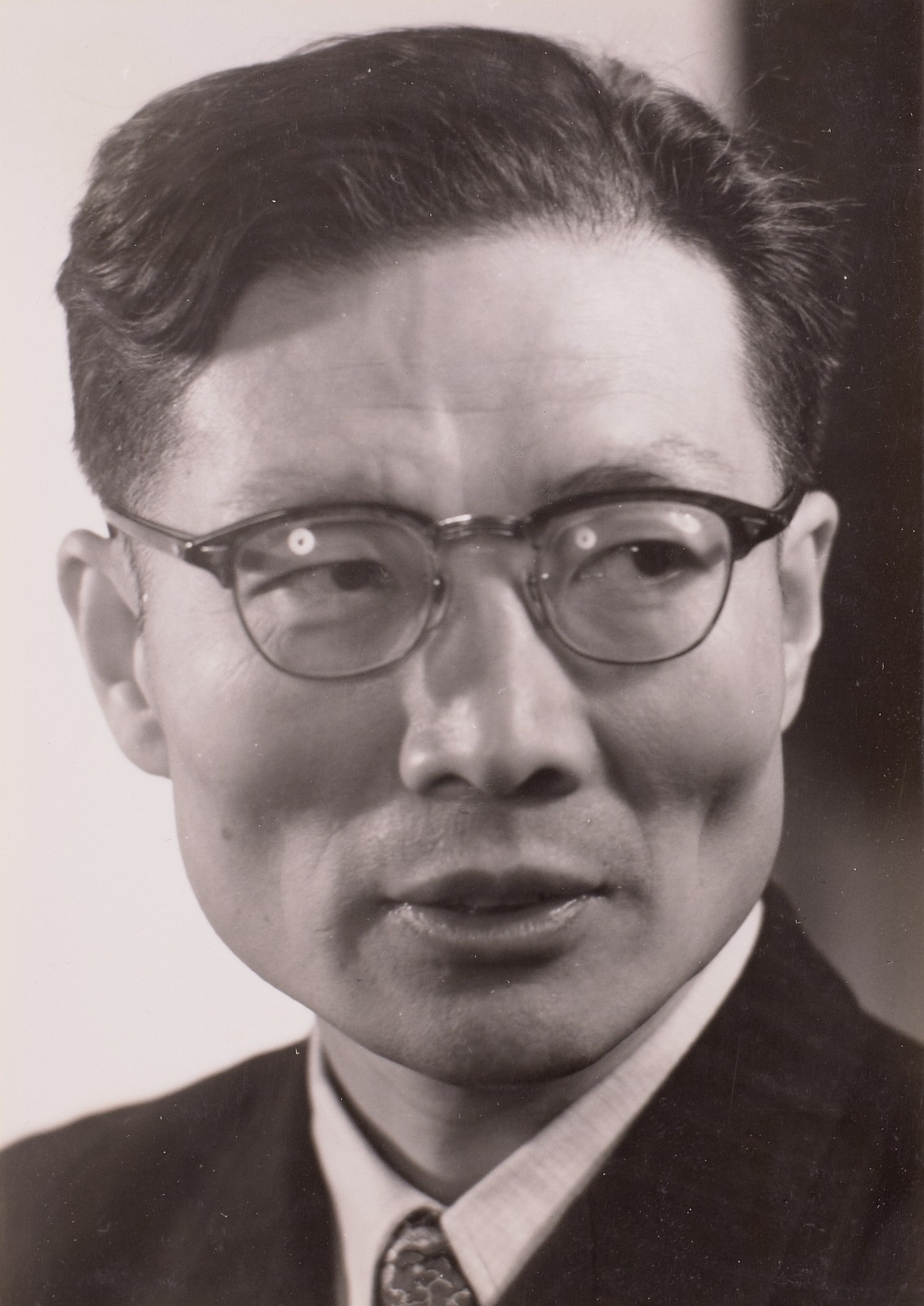
- Zhou Libo in Berlin, 1956
- Born: 9 August 1908; Yiyang, Qing China
- Died: 25 September 1979 (aged 71); Beijing, China
- Writing career
- Language: Mandarin

Zhou Libo (Chinese: 周立波; pinyin: Zhōu Lìbō; 9 August 1908 – 25 September 1979) was a Chinese novelist and translator.

== Biography ==
Zhou was born Zhou Shaoyi (Chinese: 周绍仪) in Yiyang, Hunan on 9 August 1908. He began to use the pseudonym Libo, of which sound is the resemblance of English word "liberty", in the 1930. Zhou taught himself English, then he translated some English versions of Soviet novels. He was imprisoned for supporting a workers' strike in 1932, on his release he joined the League of the Left-Wing Writers in 1934 and the Chinese Communist Party in 1935. He served as a war reporter during 1937–38, and interpreter to Agnes Smedley meantime. Then he went to Yan'an and worked at Lu Xun Art Institute (鲁迅艺术学院) in 1939.

Zhou's 1948 novel Hurricane became a celebrated novel of class struggle. Zhou received the third class Stalin Prize in 1951 for the novel.

Zhou's 1955 novel Rivulets of Steel depicts the rejuvenation of a derelict steel factory after the People's Liberation Army defeats the Japanese occupiers. The transformation of the factory is narrated through a worker who undergoes his own political transformation through the novel's progression. The novel uses the socialist realist approach. Academic Benjamin Kindler describes Rivulets of Steel as "an attempt to devise narrative strategies adequate to the conditions of the First Five Year Plan, being therefore distinct from the agrarian novels of the Yan'an period."

He had been targeted during the Cultural Revolution.

Zhou was elected as the deputy of the 1st, 2nd, and 3rd National People's Congresses.

== Works ==
- 暴风骤雨 (Baofeng zhouyu) 1948, translated as The Hurricane (Translated by Hsu Meng-Hsiung. Illustrations by Ku Yuan.) Peking: Foreign Languages Press, 1955.
- 山乡巨变 (Shanxiang jubian), 1958. translated as Great Changes in a Mountain Village (Peking: Foreign Languages Press, 1961).
