= Yiyang =

Yiyang 益阳市 I-yang
- Prefecture-level city
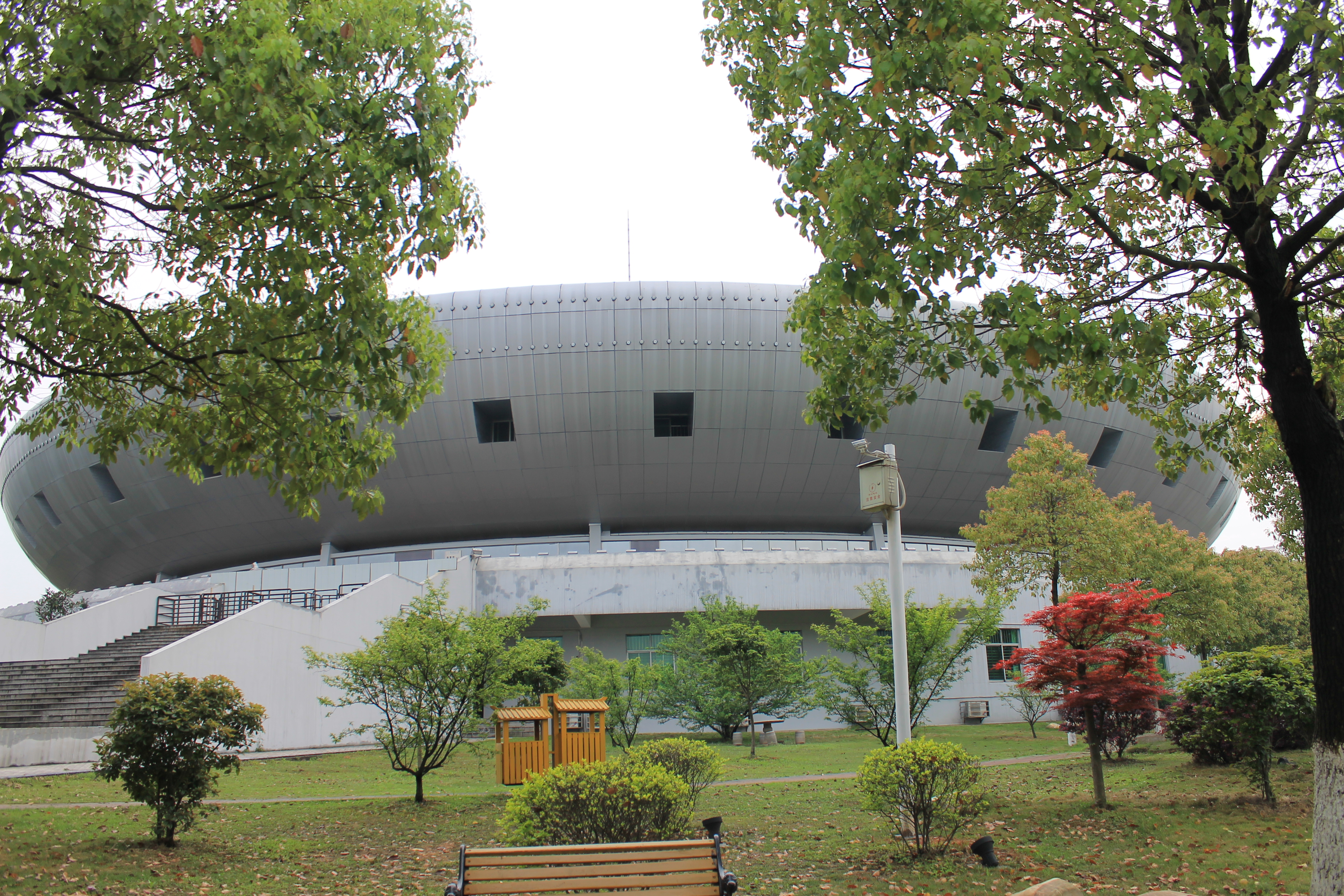
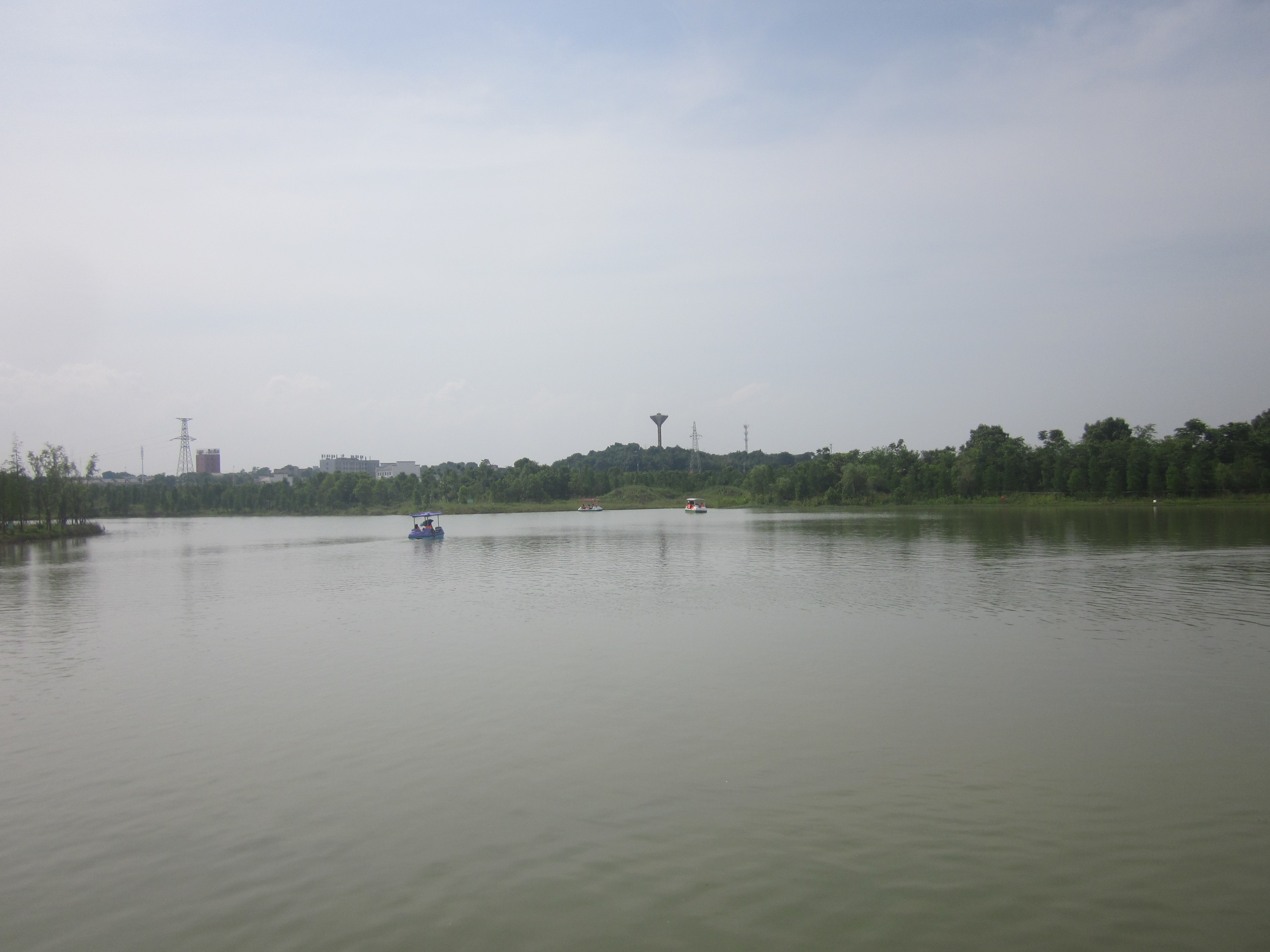
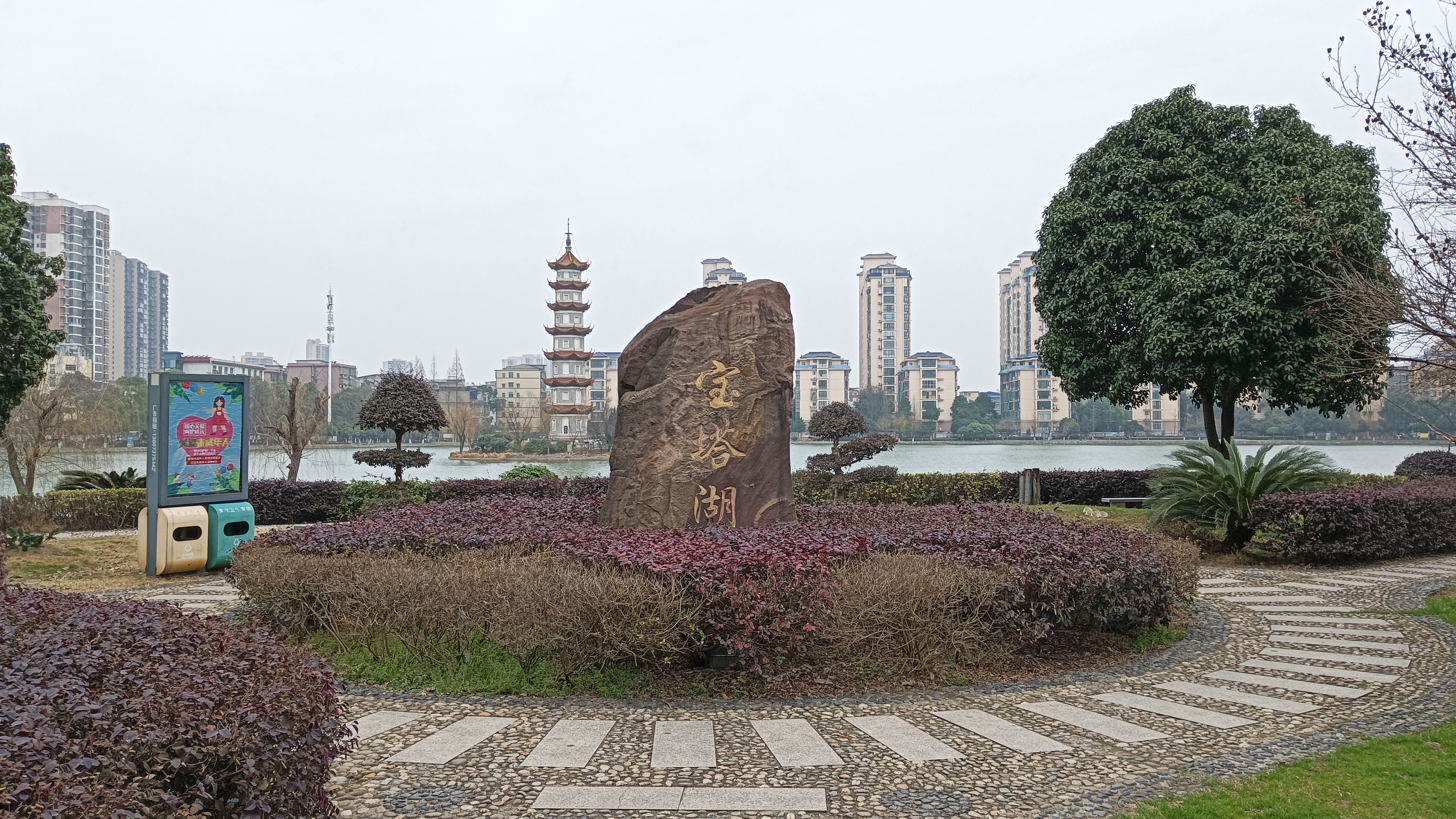
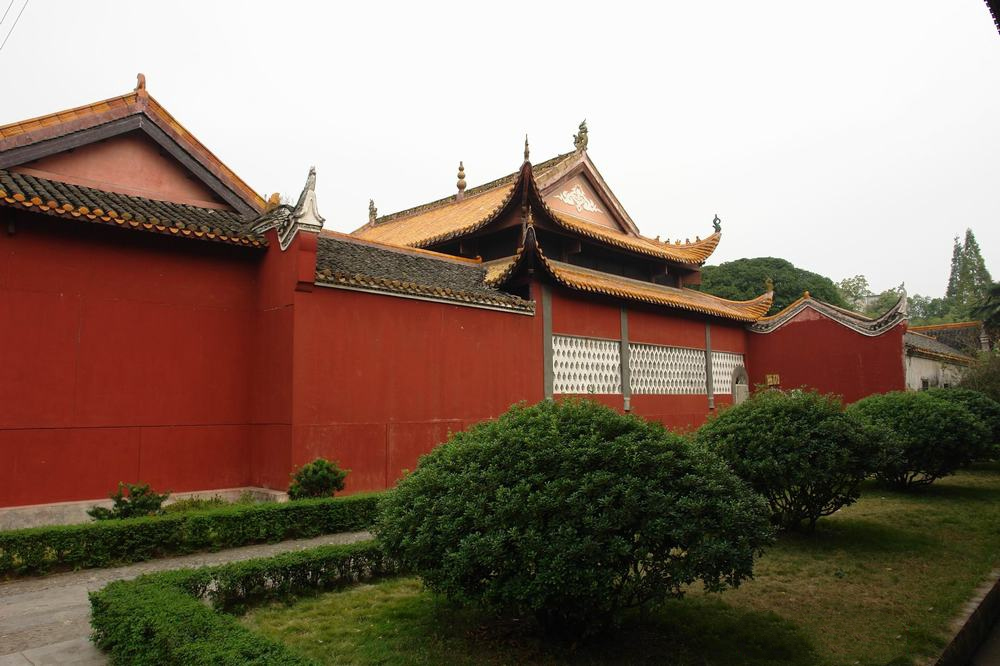
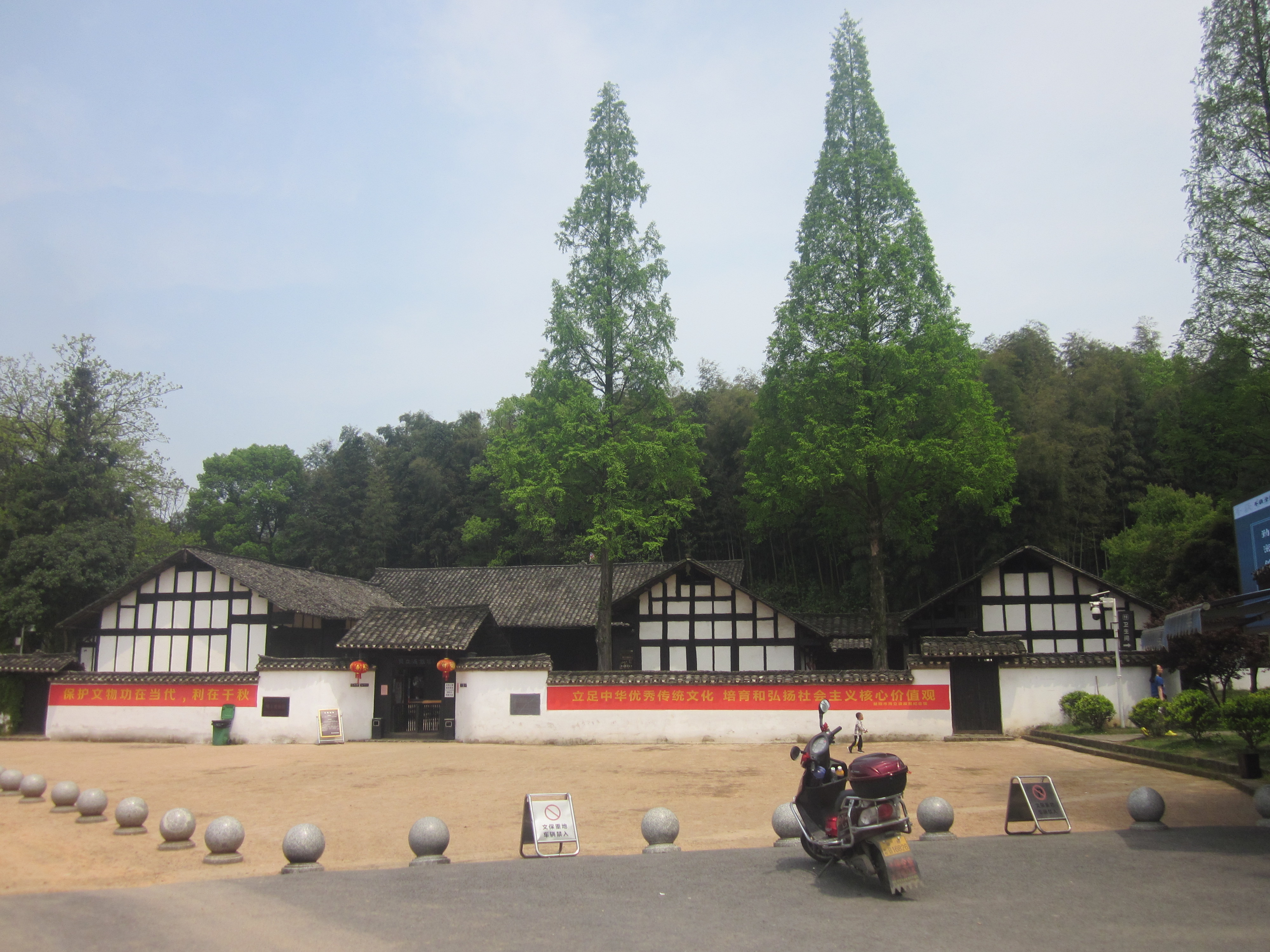
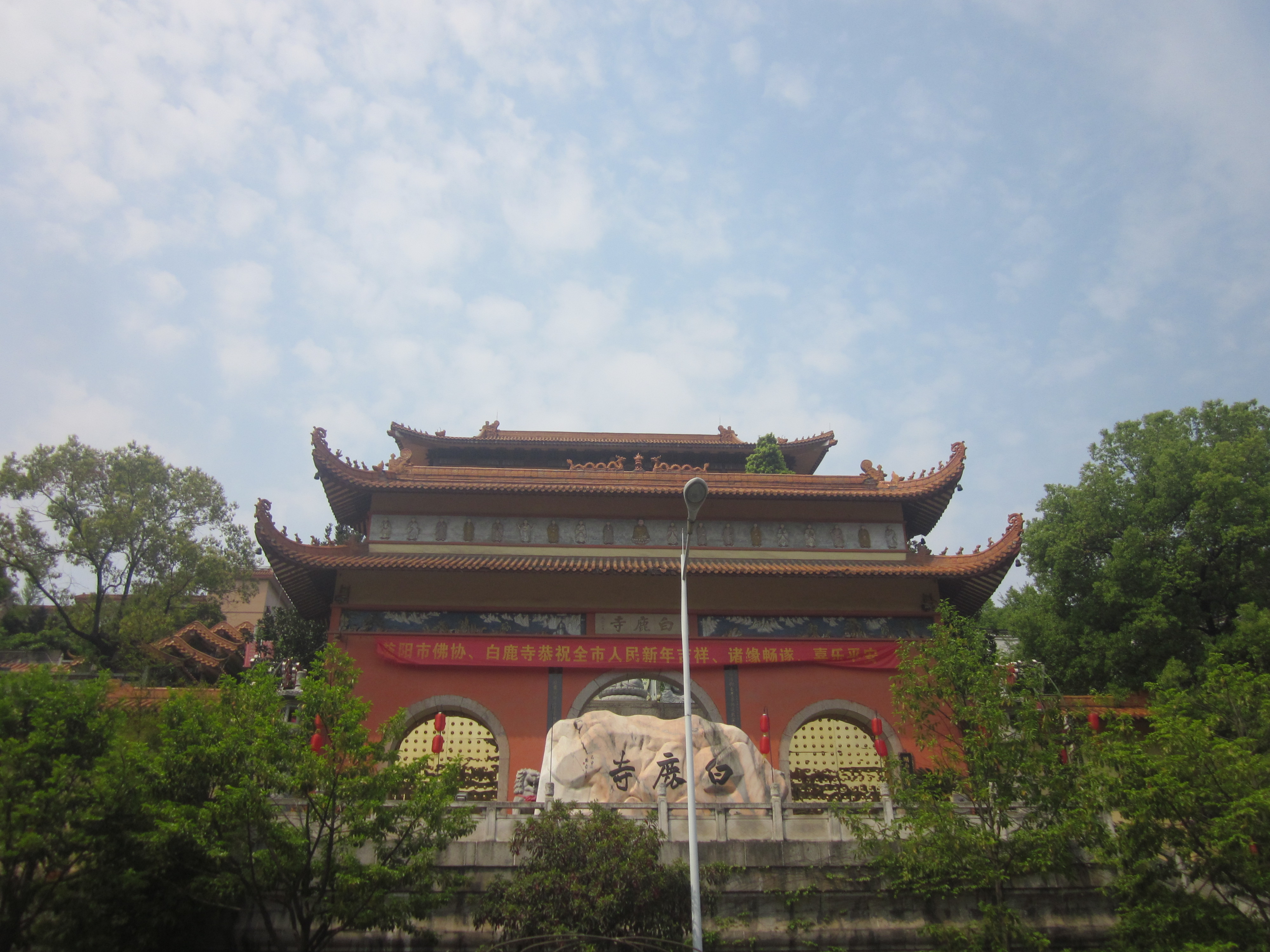
- Yiyang Stadium Yunmeng Fangzhou Water Park Baota Lake Anhua Temple of Confucius Former Residence of Zhou Libo White Deer Temple

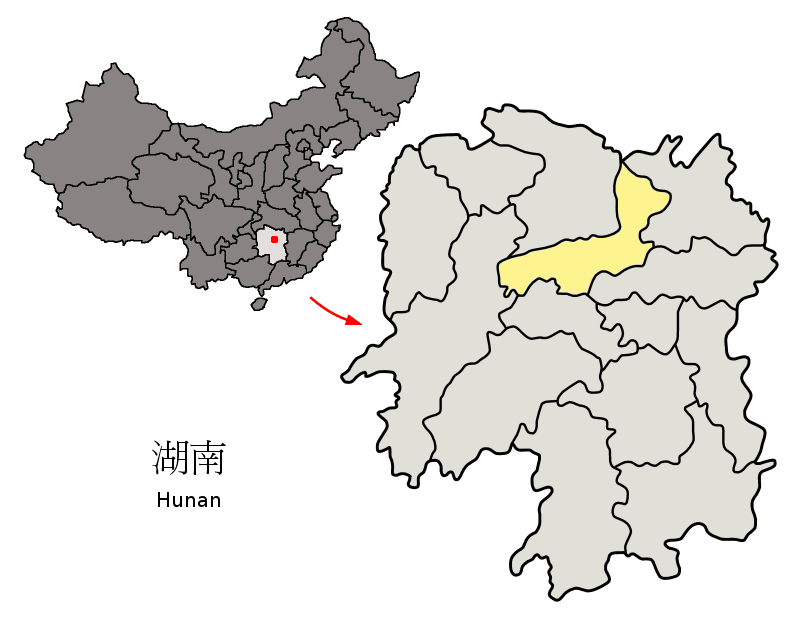
- Location of Yiyang City jurisdiction in Hunan

- Location of the city centre in Hunan
- Coordinates (Yiyang municipal government): 28°33′18″N 112°21′22″E
- Country: People's Republic of China
- Province: Hunan
- Municipal seat: Heshan District

Area
  - Prefecture-level city: 12,144 km^{2} (4,689 sq mi)
  - Urban (2017): 109.00 km^{2} (42.09 sq mi)
  - Districts: 1,851.0 km^{2} (714.7 sq mi)

Population (2010 Census)
  - Prefecture-level city: 4,313,084
  - Density: 355.16/km^{2} (919.86/sq mi)
  - Urban (2017): 666,600
  - Districts: 1,459,000

GDP
  - Prefecture-level city: CN¥ 210.8 billion US$ 31.3 billion
  - Per capita: CN¥ 55,567; US$ 8,263
- Time zone: UTC+8 (China Standard)
- Postal code: 413000
- Area code: 0737
- ISO 3166 code: CN-HN-09
- Website: www.yiyang.gov.cn/yiyang/index.htm

Yiyang (simplified Chinese: 益阳; traditional Chinese: 益陽; pinyin: Yìyáng) is a prefecture-level city on the Zi River in Hunan province, China, straddling Lake Dongting and bordering Hubei to the north. According to the 2010 Census, Yiyang has a population of 4,313,084 inhabitants residing in an area of 12,144 km^{2} (4,689 sq mi). The previous census was in 2000 when it was recorded there were 4,309,143 inhabitants.

== History ==
Yiyang county was founded in 221 BC after Qin conquered Chu state. It is designated Yiyang as the county seat was situated at the north bank of the Yi River (modern Zi River). Then the present-day jurisdiction mostly became a part of the Principality of Changsha commandery during the Western Han.

== Subdivisions ==
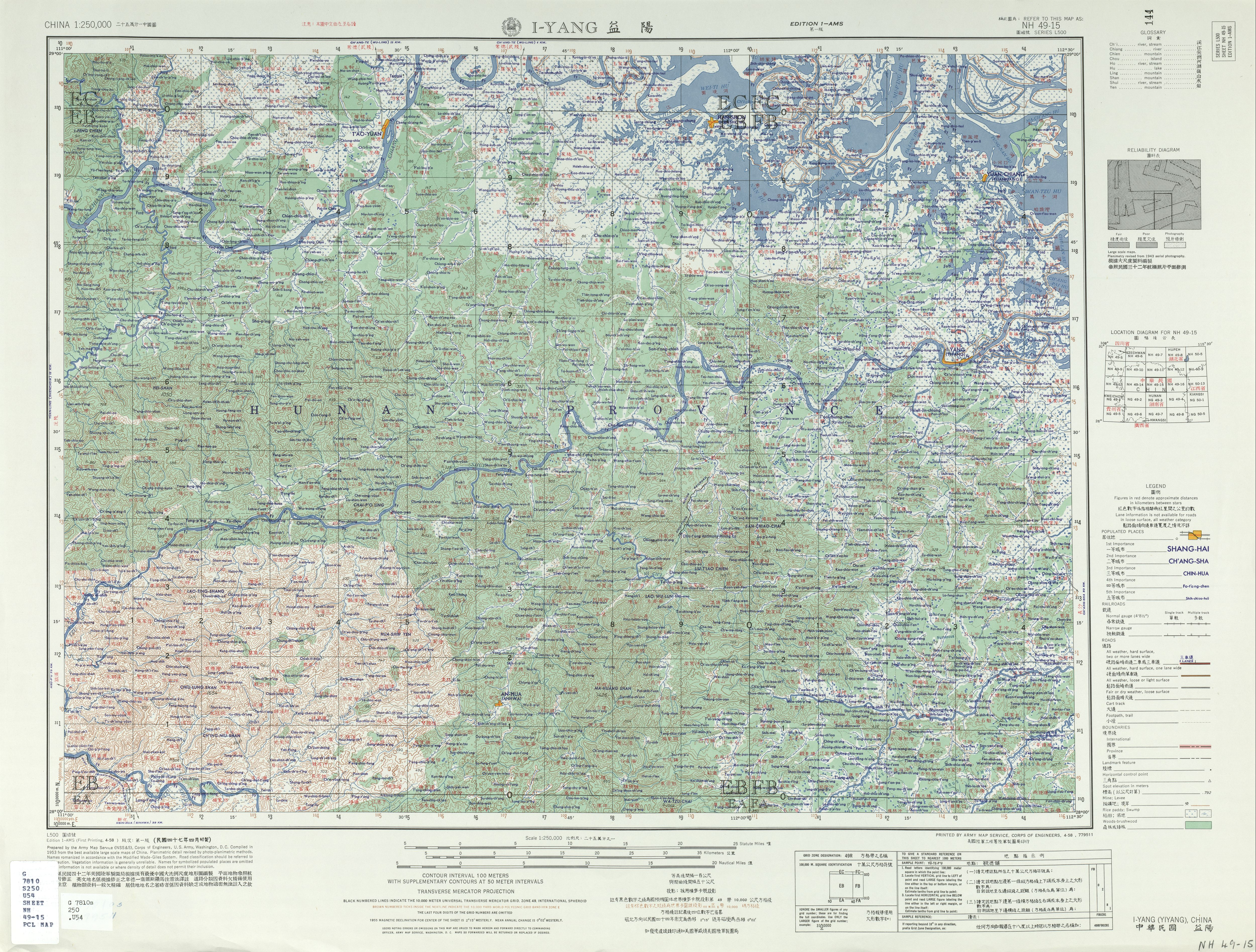
Map including Yiyang (labeled as 益陽 I-YANG (YIYANG)) (AMS, 1953)

Yiyang administers two districts, one county-level city, and three counties. The information here presented uses the metric system and data from 2010 national census.

Map
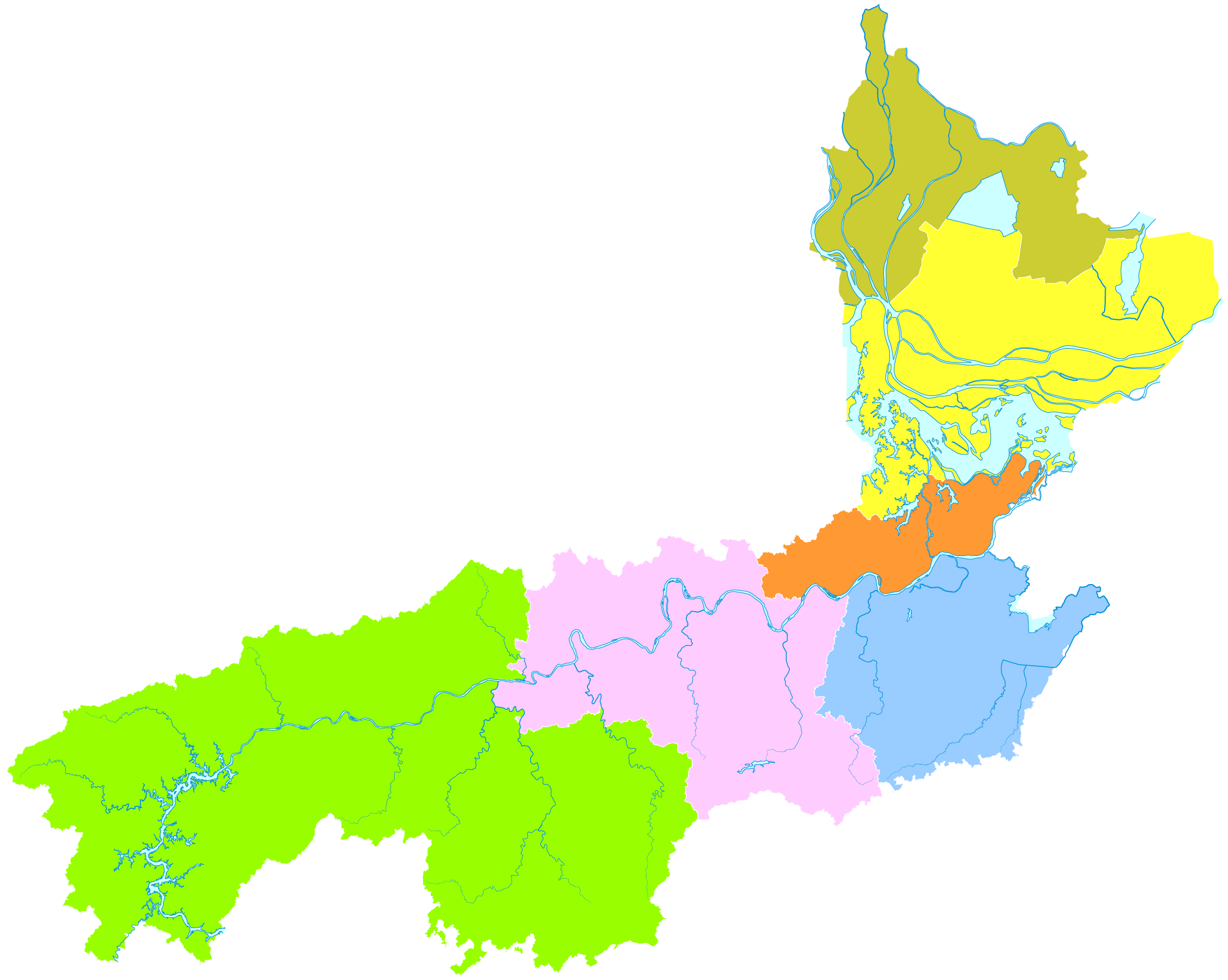

English name	Simplified	Traditional	Pinyin	Area	Population	Density
Ziyang District	资阳区	資陽區	Zīyáng Qū	680	410,542	604
Heshan District	赫山区	赫山區	Hèshān Qū	1,379	839,265	609
Yuanjiang City	沅江市		Yuánjiāng Shì	2,071	667,104	322
Nan County	南县	南縣	Nán Xiàn	1,075	725,562	675
Taojiang County	桃江县	桃江縣	Táojiāng Xiàn	2,063	769,568	373
Anhua County	安化县	安化縣	Ānhuà Xiàn	4,950	901,043	182

== Climate ==
Climate data for Yiyang (Heshan District), elevation 46 m (151 ft), (1991–2020 normals, extremes 1961–2010)
Month	Jan	Feb	Mar	Apr	May	Jun	Jul	Aug	Sep	Oct	Nov	Dec	Year
Record high °C (°F)	24.8 (76.6)	30.4 (86.7)	33.0 (91.4)	35.2 (95.4)	36.2 (97.2)	37.4 (99.3)	43.6 (110.5)	41.0 (105.8)	39.3 (102.7)	36.0 (96.8)	31.4 (88.5)	25.5 (77.9)	43.6 (110.5)
Mean daily maximum °C (°F)	8.5 (47.3)	11.4 (52.5)	16.0 (60.8)	22.4 (72.3)	26.9 (80.4)	30.0 (86.0)	33.4 (92.1)	32.6 (90.7)	28.2 (82.8)	22.9 (73.2)	17.3 (63.1)	11.3 (52.3)	21.7 (71.1)
Daily mean °C (°F)	5.1 (41.2)	7.7 (45.9)	11.9 (53.4)	17.9 (64.2)	22.6 (72.7)	26.0 (78.8)	29.2 (84.6)	28.5 (83.3)	24.1 (75.4)	18.7 (65.7)	13.0 (55.4)	7.5 (45.5)	17.7 (63.8)
Mean daily minimum °C (°F)	2.7 (36.9)	5.0 (41.0)	8.8 (47.8)	14.4 (57.9)	19.1 (66.4)	22.9 (73.2)	25.9 (78.6)	25.4 (77.7)	21.1 (70.0)	15.7 (60.3)	10.0 (50.0)	4.8 (40.6)	14.7 (58.4)
Record low °C (°F)	−8.6 (16.5)	−6.9 (19.6)	−2.1 (28.2)	2.5 (36.5)	9.5 (49.1)	14.5 (58.1)	19.4 (66.9)	17.3 (63.1)	11.4 (52.5)	3.5 (38.3)	−1.4 (29.5)	−9.2 (15.4)	−9.2 (15.4)
Average precipitation mm (inches)	80.4 (3.17)	88.3 (3.48)	147.1 (5.79)	177.9 (7.00)	199.3 (7.85)	222.3 (8.75)	189.3 (7.45)	127.7 (5.03)	97.5 (3.84)	82.3 (3.24)	82.3 (3.24)	55.1 (2.17)	1,549.5 (61.01)
Average precipitation days (≥ 0.1 mm)	13.4	13.5	16.8	15.9	15.9	14.9	11.2	10.9	9.6	11.4	10.5	10.8	154.8
Average snowy days	5.9	3.2	0.8	0	0	0	0	0	0	0	0.1	1.9	11.9
Average relative humidity (%)	79	79	79	77	77	81	76	77	78	77	77	76	78
Mean monthly sunshine hours	66.7	68.8	89.8	115.7	134.5	131.6	202.8	188.7	142.9	121.5	108.5	95.6	1,467.1
Percentage possible sunshine	20	22	24	30	32	32	48	47	39	34	34	30	33
Source: China Meteorological Administrationall-time extreme high

== Agriculture ==
Yiyang has many hilly farmlands in its vicinity. The primary crop around Yiyang is rice, with tea, and bamboo is also grown.

== Government ==
The current CPC Party Secretary of Yiyang is Qu Hai and the current mayor is Zhang Zhiheng.

== Culture, people and language ==
Huaguxi, the local Hunanese opera is very popular in Yiyang. The cuisine of Yiyang (a species of Xiang cuisine) is very famous for its spicy food made from pure chili peppers.

Yiyang has many famous people in the modern time of China. Ho Feng-Shan is very famous in the history of Chinese foreign affairs since he had saved many Jewish families in Europe and China when he worked as a diplomat for China during World War II. Libo Zhou is a well-known writer in China, who was born in Yiyang.

The language in Yiyang is "Yiyong-Wa" (Yiyang Dialect), which belongs to New Xiang dialect of the Chinese language. This dialect is very prevalent in all of Yiyang. But the western area of Anhua County of Yiyang has a slightly different accent, which is close to the Old Xiang accent of the Loudi District. Yiyang Dialect retains many ancient words and pronunciations and is influenced surprisingly little by Mandarin Chinese. Consequently, the Yiyang Dialect is very hard to understand for outsiders, although its speakers can communicate well with the speakers of other New Xiang dialects.

== Religions ==
Historically, Buddhism and Taoism both played very important roles in the life of Yiyang people. In modern times, both of these religions experienced a decline, as in many other places in China. Nowadays, however, Buddhism and Christianity have many adherents in Yiyang, respectively 340,500 and 238,100 registered members.

== Colleges and universities ==
- Hunan City University (湖南城市学院)

== International relations ==
=== Twin towns — Sister cities ===
Yiyang is twinned with:

- Stara Zagora, Bulgaria (1994.12.04)
- Namhae County, South Korea (2006)
- Petah Tikva, Israel (2011)
- Rajshahi, Bangladesh (2018)
- Guarulhos, Brazil (2019)

== Tourist attractions ==
White Deer Temple is a popular attraction.

The Former Residence of Zhou Libo is a well known tourist spot.
