= Taohuajiang =

Taohuajiang Town 桃花江镇
- Town
- Location in Hunan
- Coordinates: 28°31′26″N 112°08′03″E
- Country: People's Republic of China
- Province: Hunan
- Prefecture-level city: Yiyang
- County: Taojiang

Area
  - Total: 182 km^{2} (70 sq mi)

Population
  - Total: 86,800
  - Density: 477/km^{2} (1,240/sq mi)
- Time zone: UTC+8 (China Standard)
- Area code: 0737

Taohuajiang Town (Chinese: 桃花江镇; pinyin: Táohuājiāng Zhèn) is a town and the seat of Taojiang County in Hunan, China. It was reformed through the amalgamation of Huaguoshan Township (花果山乡), Niutanhe Township (牛潭河乡) and the former Taohuajiang Town in 2005. The town is located in the east of the county, it is bordered by Xinqiaohe Town of Ziyang District and Xiushan Town to the north, Huilongshan Subdistrict, Xielingang Town and Xinshidu Town of Heshan District to the east, Shiniujiang Town to the south, and Gaoqiao and Fuqiushan townships to the west. It covers an area of 179.685 km^{2} (69.377 sq mi) with a population of 156,286 (as of 2010 Census), the town has 21 villages and 10 communities under its jurisdiction.

== History ==
Taohuajiang is an ancient town with a long history. It was an ancient postal stop (Chinese: 驿站) named Wangfuyi (or Wangfu Postal Stop, Chinese: 望浮驿) in Tang dynasty, meanwhile it was also a way station to Xiangxiang. As an ancient postal stop, it gradually developed into a market town in Tang and Song dynasties, in those days it was known as Longxi Town (Chinese: 弄溪镇) named after the Longxi River (Chinese: 弄溪) which runs the place. In 1264 (Yuan dynasty), a military depot named Taohuajiangtang (Taohuajiang Depot, Chinese: 桃花江塘) was established. In 1684, Wangfuyi was renamed to Taohuayi (or Taohua Postal Stop, Chinese: 桃花驿) after the Taohua River.

Taohua Town was incorporated as a town in the early years of Minkuo, as part of Yiyang County. In February 1950, the seat of Yiyang County was moved into the town. In July 1951, dividing 5 county controlled districts from Yiyang County, Taojiang County was created, Taohuajiang became the seat of Taojiang County.

== Administrative divisions ==
The town is divided into 29 villages and 9 communities, which include the following areas: Tuanshan Community, Fenghuangshan Community, Jinfeng Community, Taohualu Community, Zijianglu Community, Taohuajiang Community, Furong Community, Fumin Community, Niutanhe Community, Wenjiadu Village, Huayuandong Village, Dashiwan Village, Kongtong Village, Taogushan Village, Jintao Village, Yangjia'ao Village, Huaqiao Village, Jinliuqiao Village, Lishuqiao Village, Lishuzui Village, Luojiatan Village, Banjiazhou Village, Niutanhe Village, Huachuangang Village, Hengmu Village, Daoguanshan Village, Egongqiao Village, Qingshan Village, Chuanmenwan Village, Renheqiao Village, Gongtoushan Village, Banbianshan Village, Huaguoshan Village, Zhumutan Village, Shigaoqiao Village, Dahua Village, Gongqiao Village, and Chuangye Village (团山社区、凤凰山社区、金凤社区、桃花路社区、资江路社区、桃花江社区、芙蓉社区、富民社区、牛潭河社区、文家渡村、花园洞村、打石湾村、崆峒村、桃谷山村、近桃村、杨家坳村、花桥村、金柳桥村、梨树桥村、栗树嘴村、罗家潭村、半稼洲村、牛潭河村、划船港村、横木村、道关山村、鹅公桥村、青山村、川门湾村、人和桥村、拱头山村、半边山村、花果山村、株木潭村、石高桥村、大华村、拱桥村、创业村).
