= Hengshi, Hunan =

Hengshi Town 横市镇
- Town
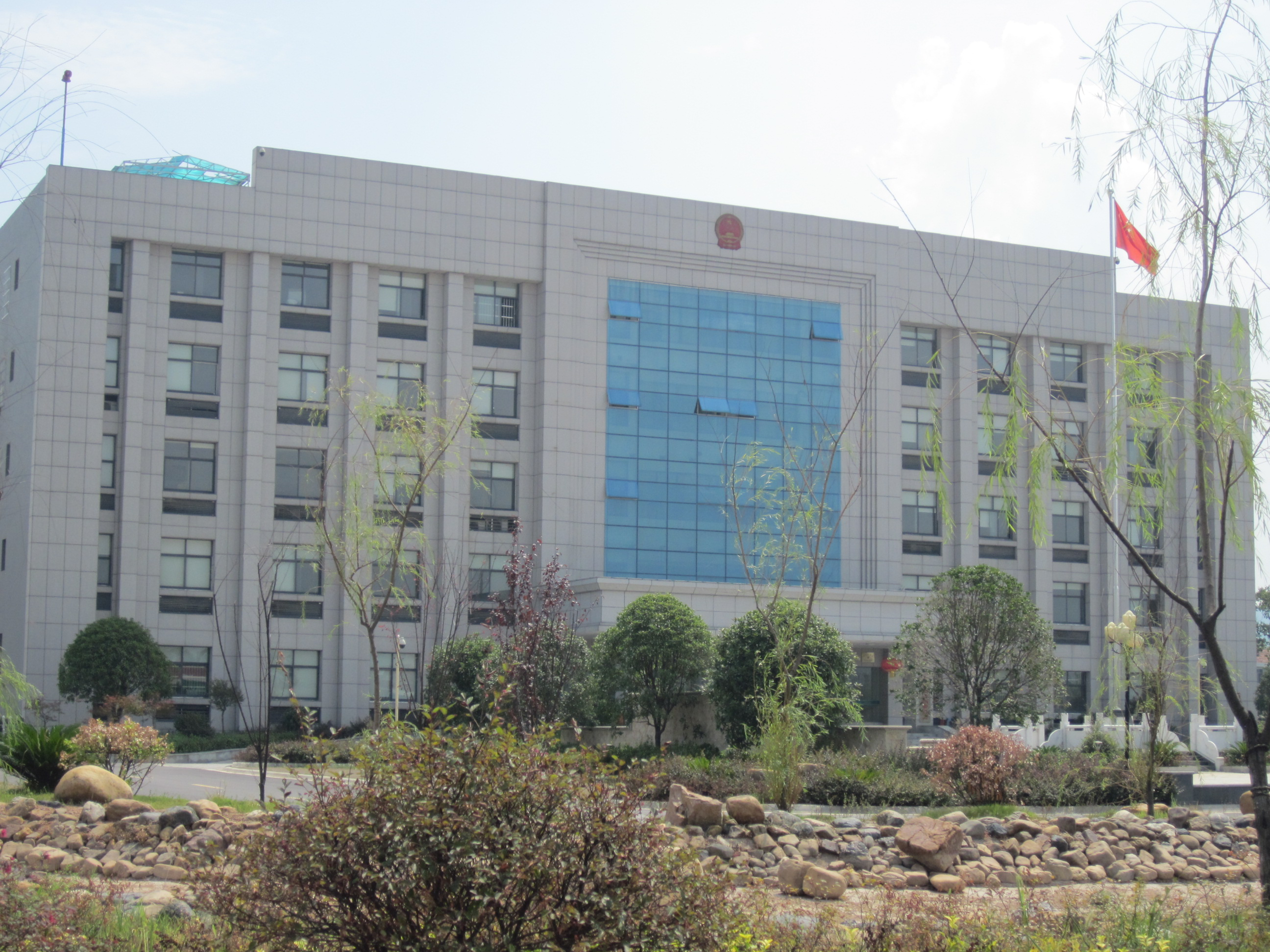
- Government building of Hengshi Town.

- Location in Hunan
- Coordinates: 28°08′50″N 112°13′19″E
- Country: People's Republic of China
- Province: Hunan
- Prefecture-level city: Changsha
- County-level city: Ningxiang

Area
  - Total: 123 km^{2} (47 sq mi)

Population
  - Total: 50,000
  - Density: 410/km^{2} (1,100/sq mi)
- Time zone: UTC+08:00 (China Standard)
- Postal code: 410626
- Area code: 0731
- Website: www.nxcity.gov.cn/hsz/index.htm

Chinese name
- Traditional Chinese: 橫市鎮
- Simplified Chinese: 横市镇
Transcriptions
Standard Mandarin
- Hanyu Pinyin: Héngshì Zhèn

Hengshi (Chinese: 横市镇) is a rural town in Ningxiang City, Hunan Province, China. It is surrounded by Huangcai Town on the west, Huishangang Town on the north, Yujia'ao Township and Shuangfupu Town on the east, and Laoliangcang Town on the south. As of the 2000 census it had a population of 47,491 and an area of 123 square kilometres (47 sq mi).

== Administrative divisions ==
As of 2018, the town administers 11 villages and one residential community:

- Hengshi Community (横市社区)
- Wangbeifeng (望北峰村)
- Yunshan (云山村)
- Xiangyang (向阳村)
- Quanliu (泉柳村)
- Hejin (合金村)
- Limin (利民村)
- Tiechong (铁冲村)
- Jietou (界头村)
- Jinfeng (金丰村)
- Guansheng (关圣村)
- Renqiao (仁桥村).

== Geography ==
The Wei River, known as "Mother River" and a tributary of the Xiang River, flows through the town.

Tiechong Reservoir (铁冲水库) is the largest reservoir and largest water body in the town.

== Economy ==
The region abounds with iron.

Tobacco and watermelon are important to the economy.

== Culture ==
Huaguxi is the most influential local theater.

== Transportation ==
=== Provincial Highway ===
The Provincial Highway S209 (省道S209) from Yutan Subdistrict, runs through Shuangfupu Town, Hengshi Town, Laoliangcang Town, Liushahe Town, Qingshanqiao Town to Loudi City.

=== Expressway ===
The S71 Yiyang-Loudi-Hengyang Expressway, which connects Yiyang, Loudi and Hengyang, runs south through Laoliangcang Town, Liushahe Town and Hutian Town to its southern terminus at the junction of Changsha-Shaoshan-Loudi Expressway, and the north through Yujia'ao Township and Huishangang Town to Heshan District of Yiyang.

=== Railway ===
The Luoyang–Zhanjiang Railway, from Luoyang City, Henan Province to Zhanjiang City, Guangdong Province, runs through Hengshi Town at Hengshi Railway Station.
