= Yujia'ao Township =

Yujia'ao Township 喻家坳乡
- Township
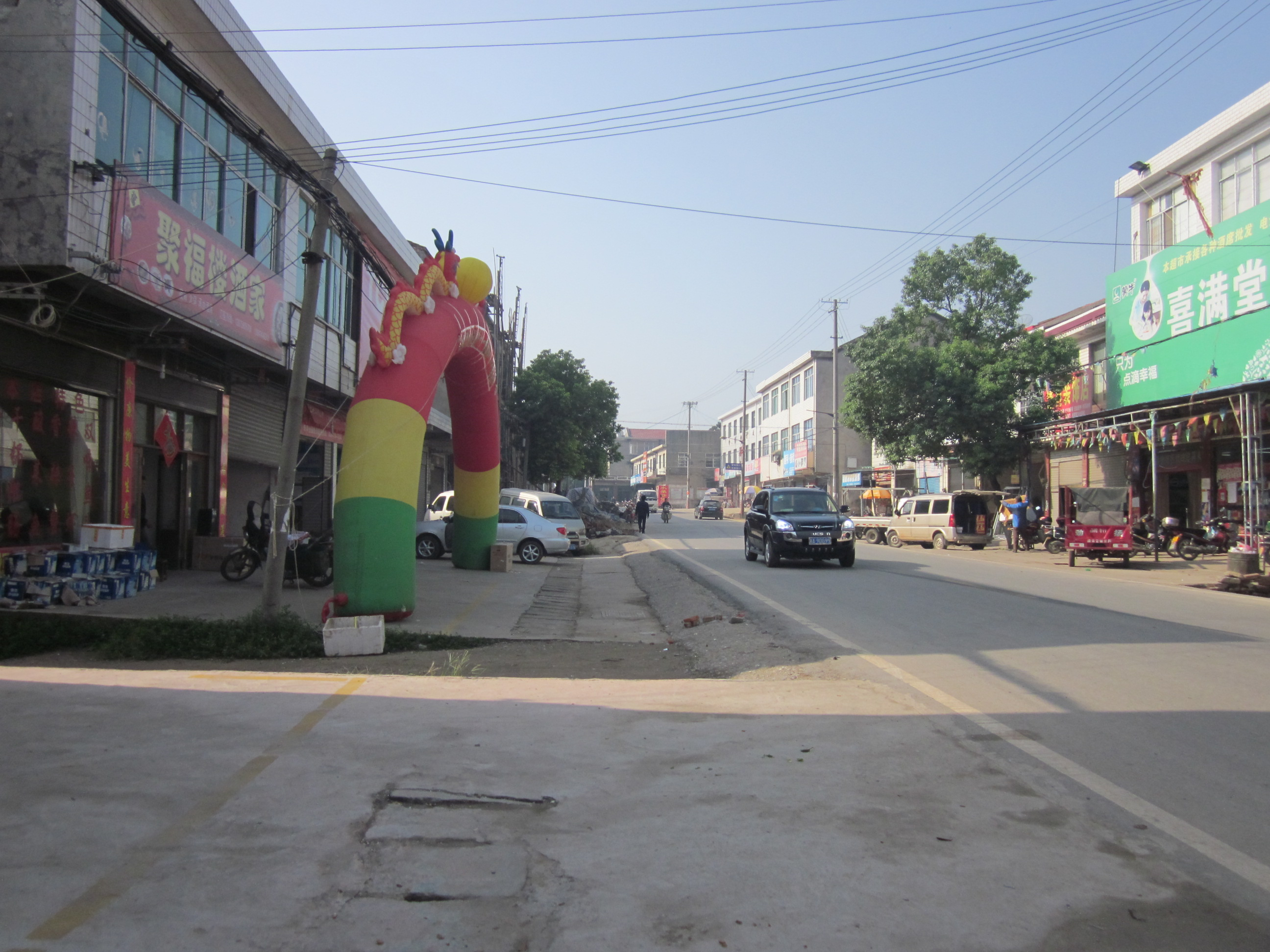

- Location in Hunan
- Coordinates: 28°11′20″N 112°17′25″E
- Country: People's Republic of China
- Province: Hunan
- Prefecture-level city: Changsha
- County-level city: Ningxiang

Area
  - Total: 96.85 km^{2} (37.39 sq mi)

Population
  - Total: 39,000
  - Density: 400/km^{2} (1,000/sq mi)
- Time zone: UTC+08:00 (China Standard)
- Postal code: 410625
- Area code: 0731
- Website: www.nxcity.gov.cn/yja/index.htm

Chinese name
- Traditional Chinese: 喻家坳鄉
- Simplified Chinese: 喻家坳乡
Transcriptions
Standard Mandarin
- Hanyu Pinyin: Yǔjiā'ào Xiāng

Yujia'ao Township (Chinese: 喻家坳乡) is a rural township in Ningxiang City, Hunan Province, China. It is surrounded by Hengshi Town on the west, Huishangang Town and Yuejiaqiao Town on the north, Meitanba Town on the east, and Shuangfupu Town and Dachengqiao Town on the south. As of the 2000 census, it had a population of 35,670 and an area of 96.85 square kilometres (37.39 sq mi).

== Administrative divisions ==
The township is divided into eight villages:

- Yujia'ao (喻家坳村)
- Nanling (南岭村)
- Yongquanshan (涌泉山村)
- Taipingshan (太平山村)
- Huxitang (湖溪塘村)
- Shenwu (神武村)
- Gaotian (高田村)
- Quanlong (泉龙村)

== Geography ==
Xiashankou Reservoir (峡山口水库) is the largest reservoir and largest water body in the township.

== Economy ==
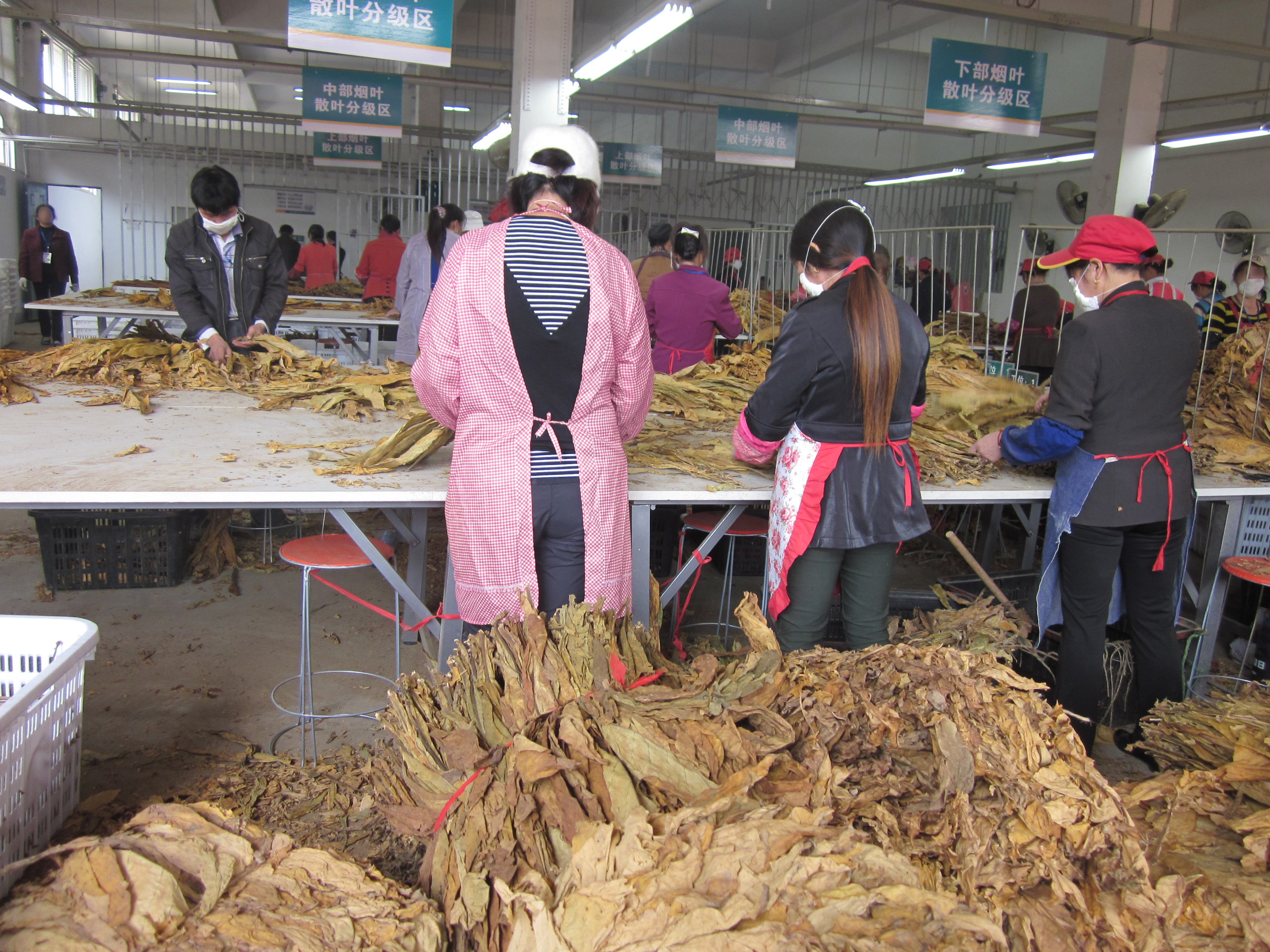
Tobacco.

Watermelon and tobacco are important to the economy.

The region is a major source of Chinese coal.

== Culture ==
Huaguxi is the most influential local theater.

== Transportation ==
=== Provincial Highway ===
The Provincial Highway S224 runs south to north through the township.

=== Expressway ===
The S71 Yiyang-Loudi-Hengyang Expressway, which connects Yiyang, Loudi and Hengyang, runs south through Hengshi Town, Laoliangcang Town, Liushahe Town and Hutian Town to its southern terminus at the junction of Changsha-Shaoshan-Loudi Expressway, and the north through Huishangang Town to Heshan District of Yiyang.
