= Laoliangcang =

Laoliangcang 老粮仓镇
- Town
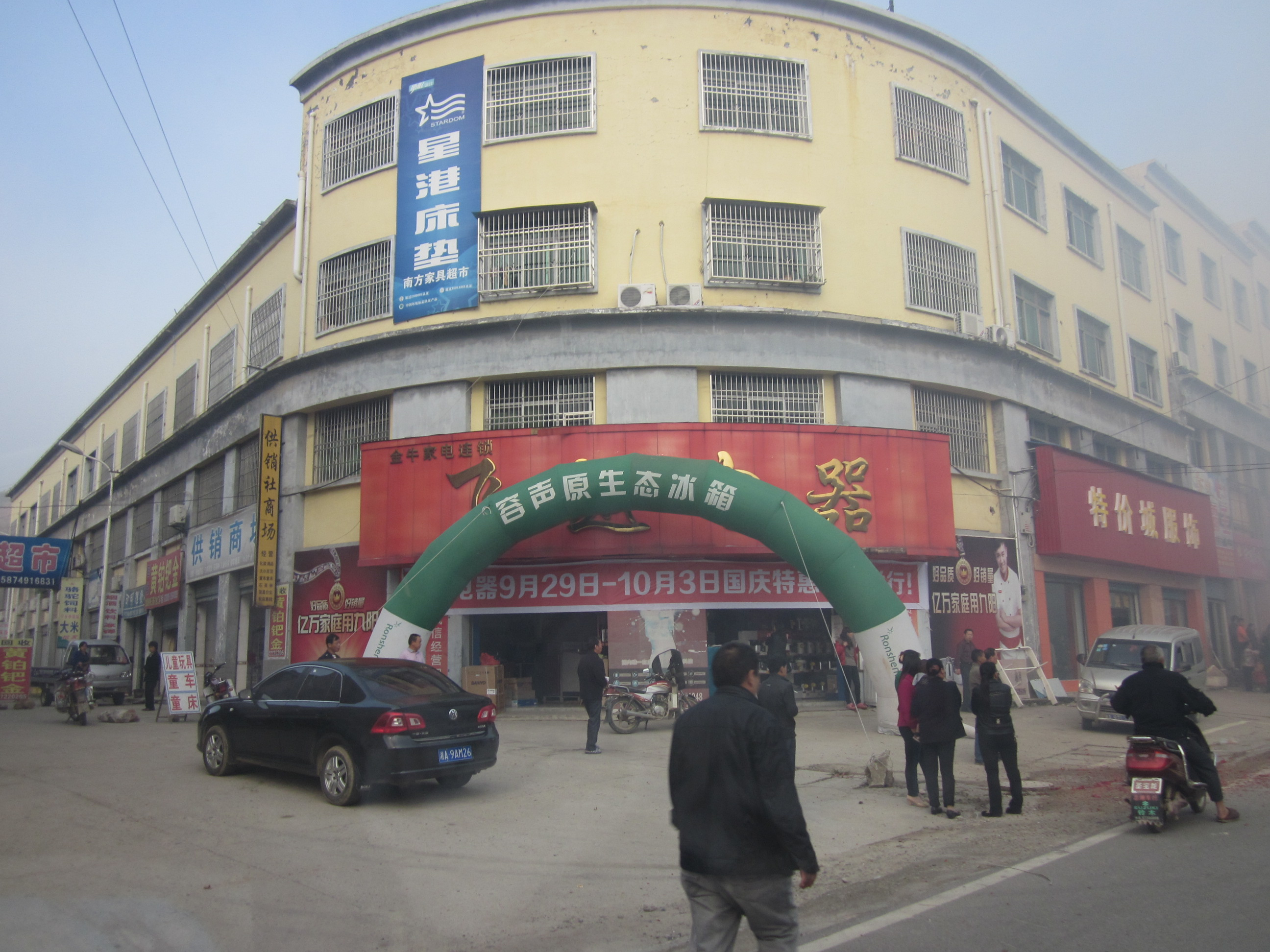
- Etymology: 老, Lǎo ("old"); 粮仓, liángcāng ("grain elevator")
- Location in Hunan
- Coordinates: 28°04′07″N 112°12′44″E
- Country: People's Republic of China
- Province: Hunan
- Prefecture-level city: Changsha
- County-level city: Ningxiang

Area
  - Total: 121.8 km^{2} (47.0 sq mi)

Population
  - Total: 63,000
  - Density: 520/km^{2} (1,300/sq mi)
- Time zone: UTC+08:00 (China Standard)
- Postal code: 410632
- Area code: 0731
- Website: www.nxcity.gov.cn/llc/index.htm

Chinese name
- Traditional Chinese: 老糧倉鎮
- Simplified Chinese: 老粮仓镇
Transcriptions
Standard Mandarin
- Hanyu Pinyin: Lǎoliángcāng Zhèn

Laoliangcang (Chinese: 老粮仓镇) is a town in Ningxiang City, Hunan Province, China. It is surrounded by Huangcai Town on the northwest, Hengshi Town on the northeast, Shuangfupu Town on the east, Huitang Town on the southeast, and Liushahe Town on the southwest. As of the 2007 census, it had a population of 63,000 and an area of 121.8 square kilometres (47.0 sq mi). It is famous for the bronze culture of the Shang culture.

== Administrative divisions ==
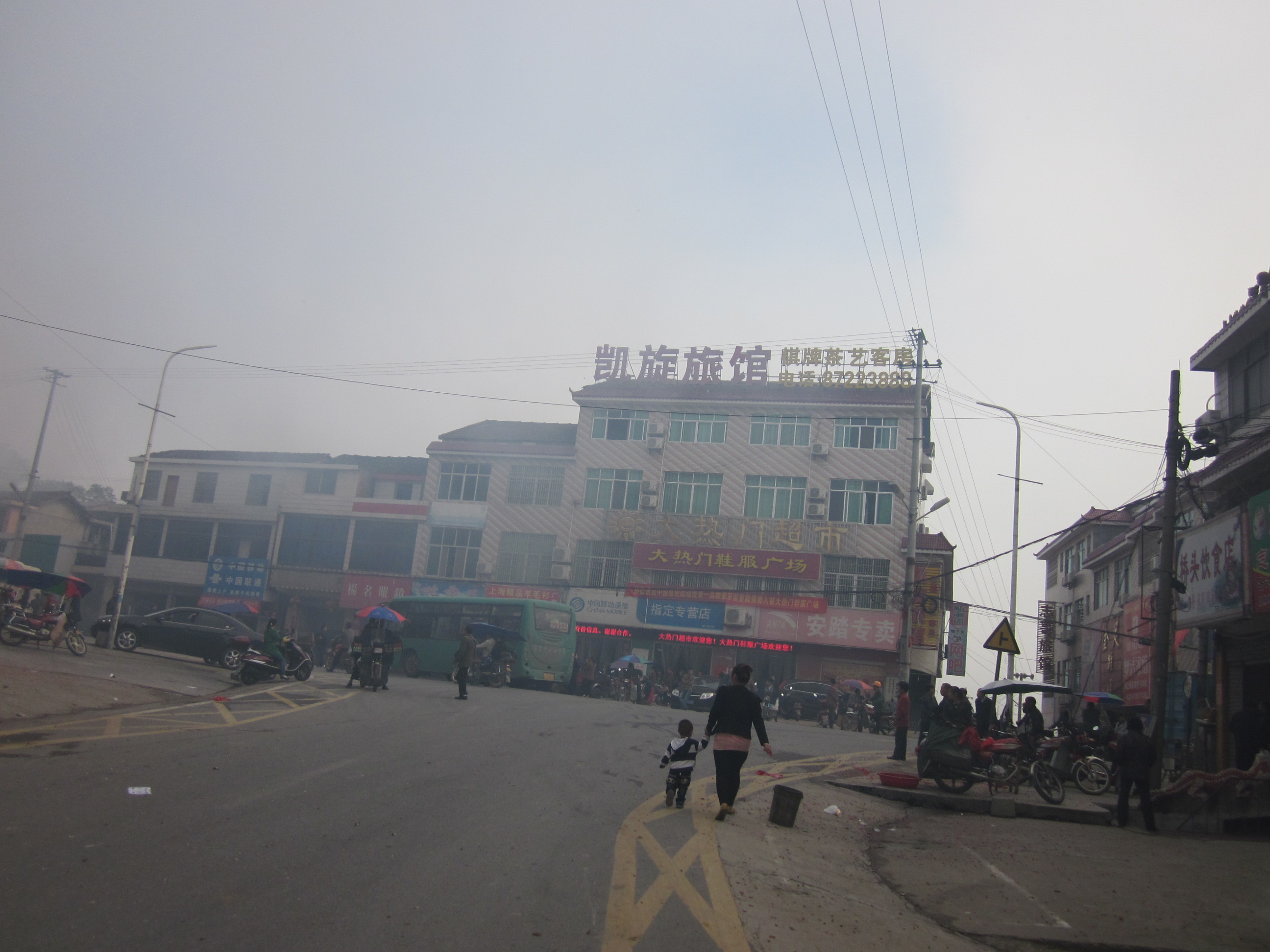
Laoliangcang, Ningxiang.

The town is divided into eight villages and two communities:

- Laoliangcang Community (老粮仓社区)
- Tangshi Community (唐市社区)
- Changtian (长田村)
- Huichuntang (回春堂村)
- Jianghua (江花村)
- Jinhong (金洪村)
- Shuangou (双藕村)
- Maogongqiao (毛公桥村)
- Xingshi (星石村)
- Wangjiang (望江村)

== Geography ==
Chu River is known as "Liushahe" (流沙河), a tributary of the Wei River, it flows through the town.

== Economy ==
Citrus, prunus mume and tobacco are important to the economy.

== Education ==
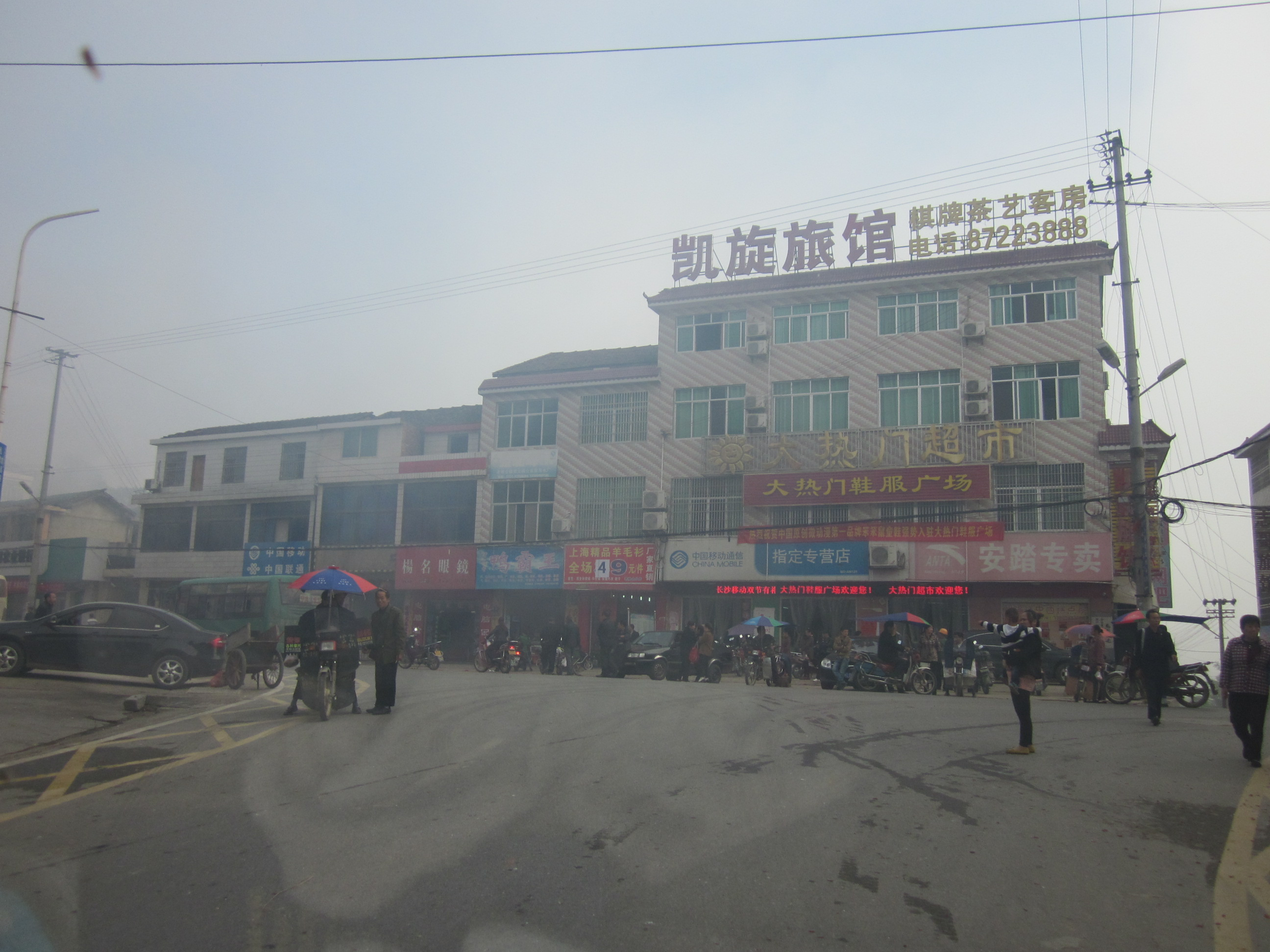
Laoliangcang, Ningxiang.

Ningxiang Sixth Senior High School (宁乡六中) is the only senior high school in the town. Public junior high schools in the town include the Laoliangcang Junior High School (老粮仓中学), Maogongqiao Junior High School (毛公桥中学), Tangshi Junior High School (唐市中学). Primary schools in the town include the Laoliangcang Central School (老粮仓中心小学), Laoliangcang School (老粮仓完小), Tangshi School (唐市小学)

== Culture ==
Huaguxi is the most influential local theater.

Wangbai Mountain (望北峰) and Lanshan Mountain (烂山峡) are the scenic spots in the town.

== Transportation ==
=== County Road ===
The County Road X096 runs southeast to Huitang Town.

The County Road X098 runs east to Mount Huilong Scenic Spot.

The County Road X105 intersects with the County Road X104.

=== Provincial Highway ===
Among the major highways that connect Laoliangcang Town to the rest of Hunan Province include S209, which runs south through Qingshanqiao Town to Hutian Town and north to Hengshi Town.

=== Expressway ===
The S71 Yiyang-Loudi-Hengyang Expressway, which connects Yiyang, Loudi and Hengyang, runs south through Liushahe Town and Hutian Town to its southern terminus at the junction of Changsha-Shaoshan-Loudi Expressway, and the north through Hengshi Town, Yujia'ao Township and Huishangang Town to Heshan District of Yiyang.

=== Railway ===
The Luoyang–Zhanjiang railway, from Luoyang City, Henan Province to Zhanjiang City, Guangdong Province, through Laoliangcang Town at Laoliangcang Railway Station.

== Attractions ==
The Yunshan School (云山学校), built in the late Qing dynasty, is a famous scenic site.
