= Huangcai =

Huangcai Town 黄材镇
- Town
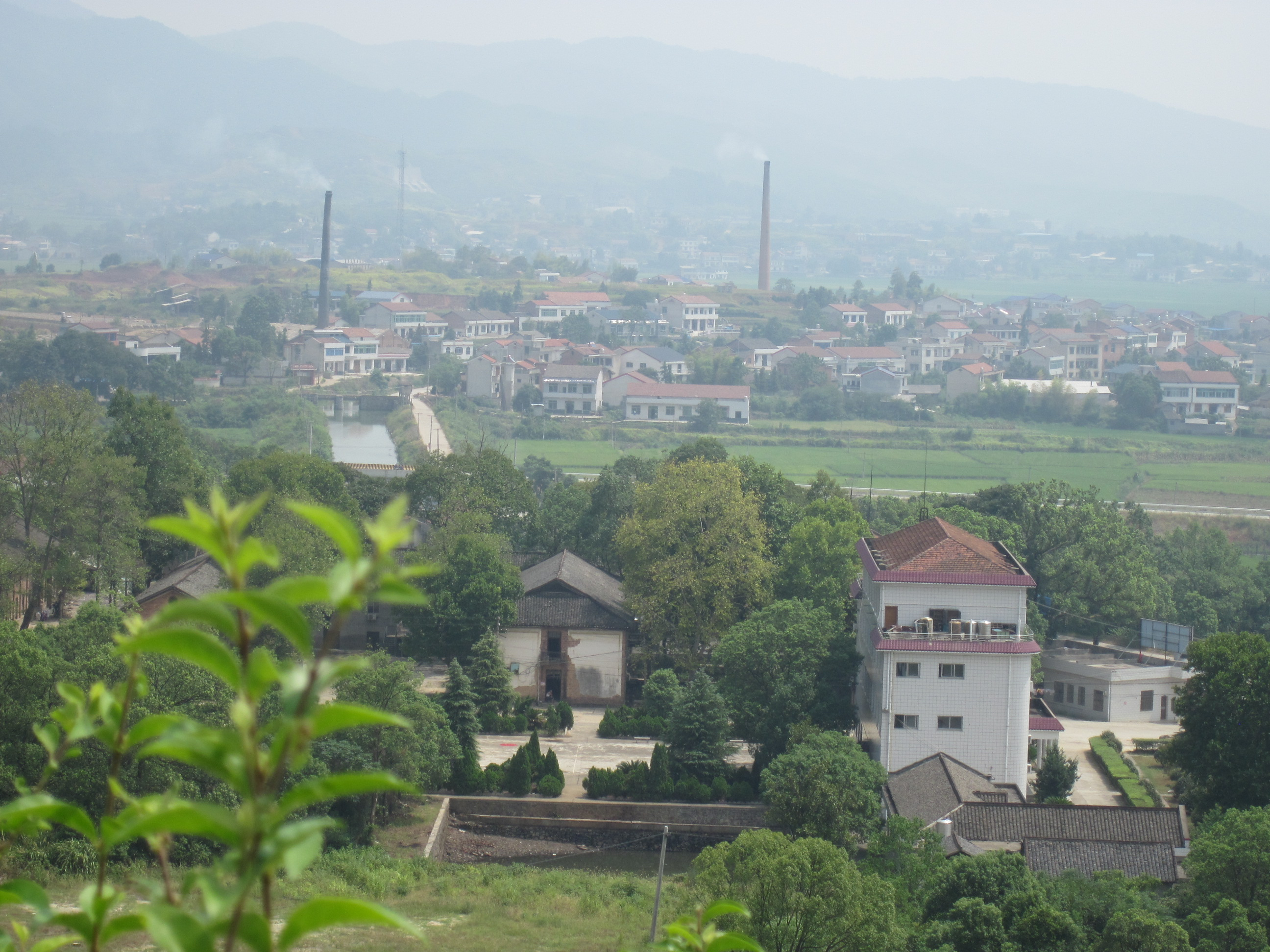

- Location in Hunan
- Coordinates: 28°08′58″N 112°07′29″E
- Country: People's Republic of China
- Province: Hunan
- Prefecture-level city: Changsha
- County-level city: Ningxiang

Area
  - Total: 220 km^{2} (85 sq mi)

Population
  - Total: 62,000
  - Density: 280/km^{2} (730/sq mi)
- Time zone: UTC+08:00 (China Standard)
- Postal code: 410627
- Area code: 0731

Chinese name
- Traditional Chinese: 黃材鎮
- Simplified Chinese: 黄材镇
Transcriptions
Standard Mandarin
- Hanyu Pinyin: Huángcaí Zhèn

Huangcai Town (Chinese: 黄材镇) is a rural town in Ningxiang City, Hunan Province, China. It is surrounded by Xiangzikou Town, Shatian Township and Weishan Township on the west, Songmutang Town on the north, Hengshi Town on the east, and Laoliangcang Town and Liushahe Town on the south. As of the 2000 census it had a population of 55,412 and an area of 220 square kilometres (85 sq mi). It is known for the bronze culture of the Shang culture at Laoliangcang Town.

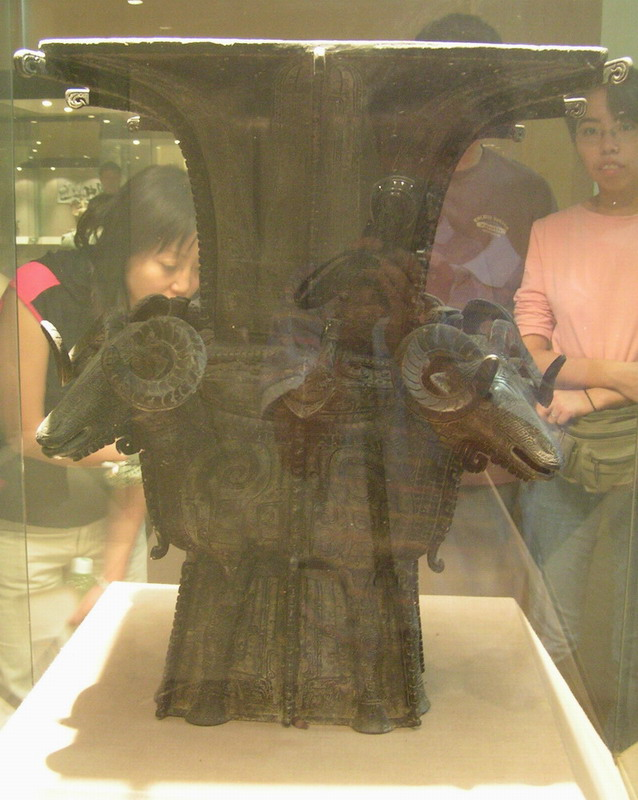
Siyangfangzun Vessel or Four Ram Zun Vessel (四羊方尊): Unearthed at Zhuan'erlun hillside (转耳仑山腰), discovered by Jiang Jingsu (姜景舒) and his other two brothers in April 1938.

== Administrative divisions ==
The town is divided into 16 villages and one community:

- Qingyang Community (青羊社区)
- Huangcai (黄材村)
- Yueshan (月山村)
- Longquan (龙泉村)
- Shaping (沙坪村)
- Ningfeng (宁峰村)
- Jingchong (井冲村)
- Juanshui (涓水村)
- Songxi (松华村)
- Xinqiao (新桥村)
- Shishan (石山村)
- Shilongdong (石龙洞村)
- Cuiping (崔坪村)
- Tanheli (炭河里村)
- Weibin (沩滨村)
- Shishi'an (石狮庵村)
- Duanxi Village (塅溪村)

== Geography ==
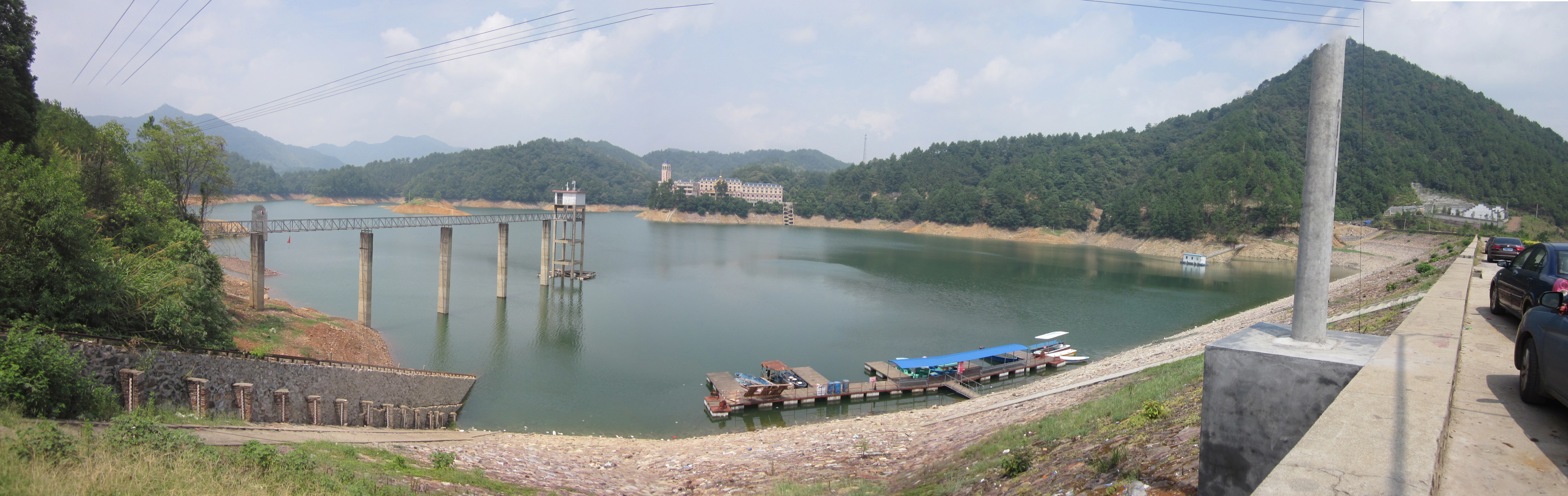
Huangcai Reservoir.

Huangcai Reservoir is the largest reservoir in Ningxiang, it is located in the town.

Wei River is known as "Mother River", a tributary of the Xiang River, it flows through the town.

== Economy ==
The region abounds with coal, manganese and uranium.

Capsicum annuum is important to the economy.

== Education ==
There is one senior high school located with the town limits: Ningxiang Third Senior High School (宁乡三中).

== Culture ==
Huaguxi is the most influential local theater.

== Transport ==
The County Road X211 travels east to west through the town.

The County Road X104 passes across the town east to southwest.

== Notable people ==
- Gan Siqi, a general in the People's Liberation Army.
