= Shuangfupu =

Shuangfupu Town 双凫铺镇
- Town
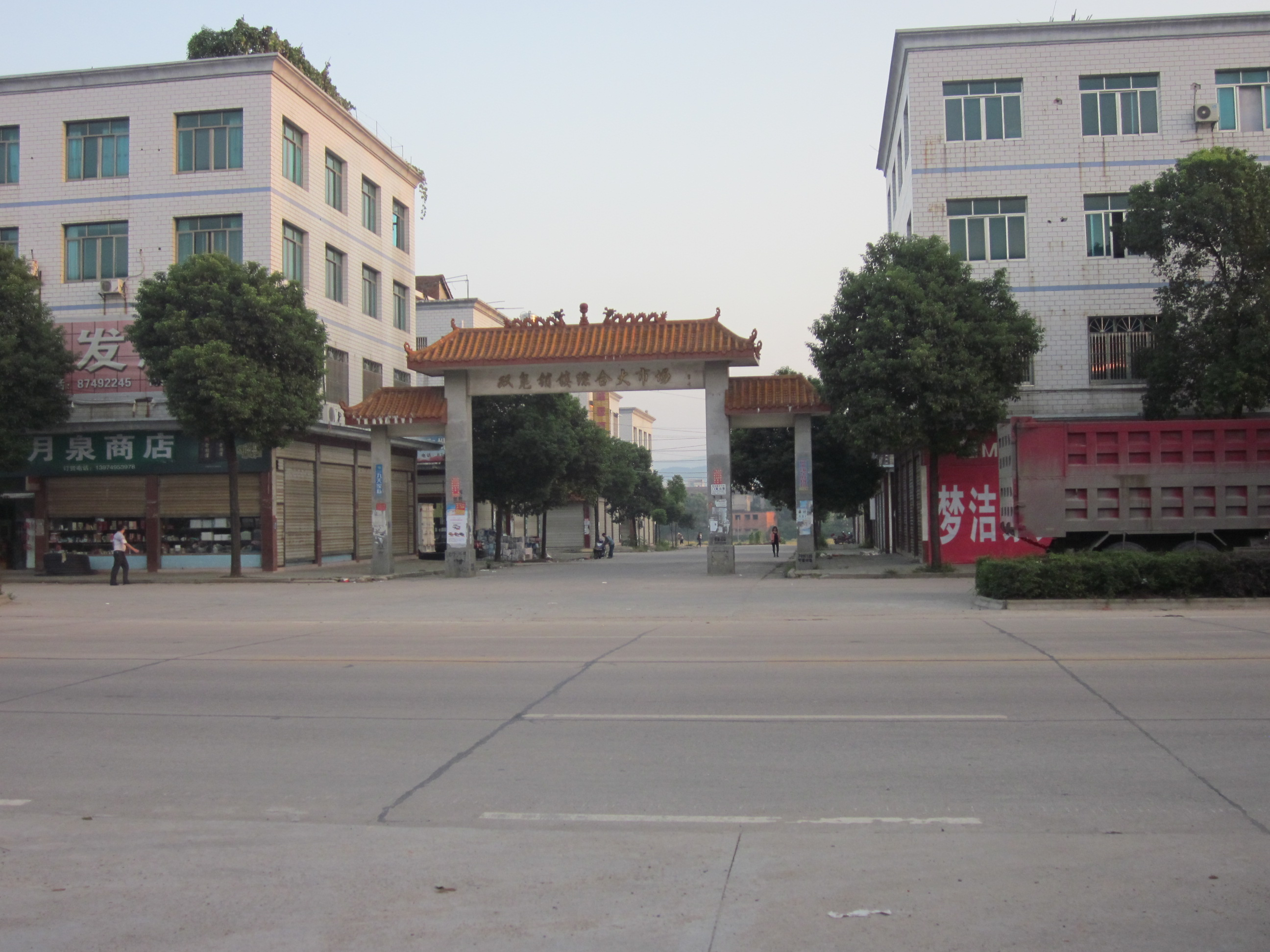

- Location in Hunan
- Coordinates: 28°07′49″N 112°17′32″E
- Country: People's Republic of China
- Province: Hunan
- Prefecture-level city: Changsha
- County-level city: Ningxiang

Area
  - Total: 62.9 km^{2} (24.3 sq mi)

Population
  - Total: 47,000
  - Density: 750/km^{2} (1,900/sq mi)
- Time zone: UTC+08:00 (China Standard)
- Postal code: 410624
- Area code: 0731

Chinese name
- Traditional Chinese: 雙鳧鋪鎮
- Simplified Chinese: 双凫铺镇
Transcriptions
Standard Mandarin
- Hanyu Pinyin: Shuāngfúpù Zhèn

Shuangfupu (Chinese: 双凫铺镇) is a town in Ningxiang City, Hunan Province, China. It is surrounded by Laoliangcang Town and Hengshi on the west, Yujia'ao Township on the north, Dachengqiao Town and Zifu on the east, and Huitang Town on the south. As of the 2000 census it had a population of 36,374 and an area of 89.5 square kilometres (34.6 sq mi).

== Administrative division ==
The town is divided into seven villages and one community:

- Shuangfupu Community (双凫铺社区)
- Quanjing (泉井村)
- Huilongshan (迴龙山村)
- Maitian (麦田村)
- Yuxin (余新村)
- Hexuan (合轩村)
- Sujiang (粟江村)
- Shuangming Village (双明村)

== Geography ==
The Wei River is known as "Mother River", a tributary of the Xiang River, it flows through the town.

Jindong Reservoir (金洞水库) is the largest reservoir and largest water body in the town.

== Economy ==
The region abounds with iron.

Prunus mume, tobacco and watermelon are important to the economy.

There are several shoe enterprises in the town, such as Jiemei (洁美), Luge (陆戈) and Fuqiang (富强).

== Education ==
There is one senior high school located with the town limits: Ningxiang Fifth Senior High School (宁乡五中).

== Culture ==
Huaguxi is the most influential local theater.

== Transportation ==
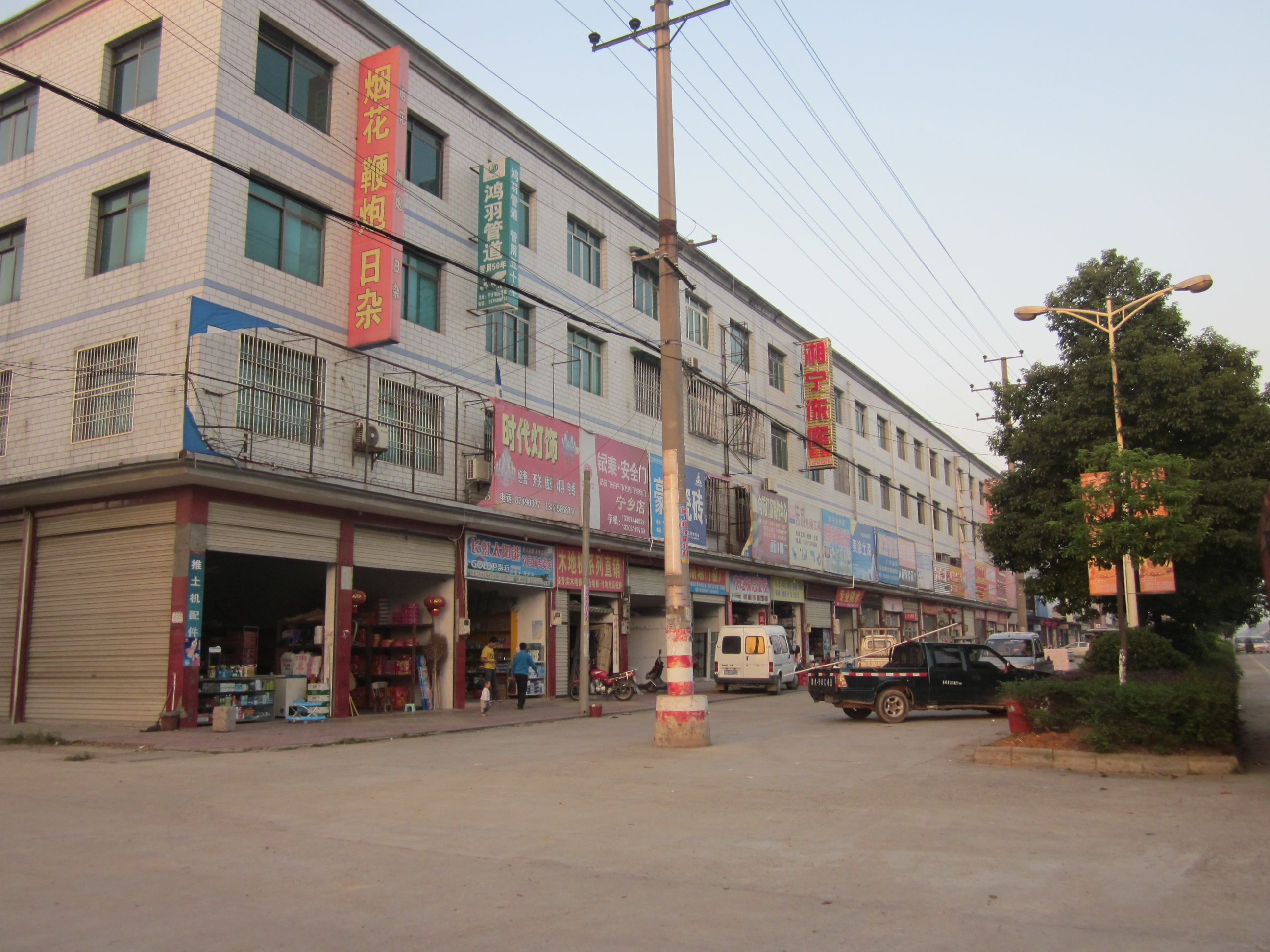
Shuangfupu, Ningxiang.

The Provincial Highway S209 (209省道) from Yutan Subdistrict, running through Shuangfupu Town, Hengshi Town, Laoliangcang Town, Liushahe Town, Qingshanqiao Town to Loudi City.

The Provincial Highway S224 (224省道) runs northeast to Meitanba.

The County Road X091 passes across the town east to west.

The County Road X097 travels south to Huitang.

== Attractions ==
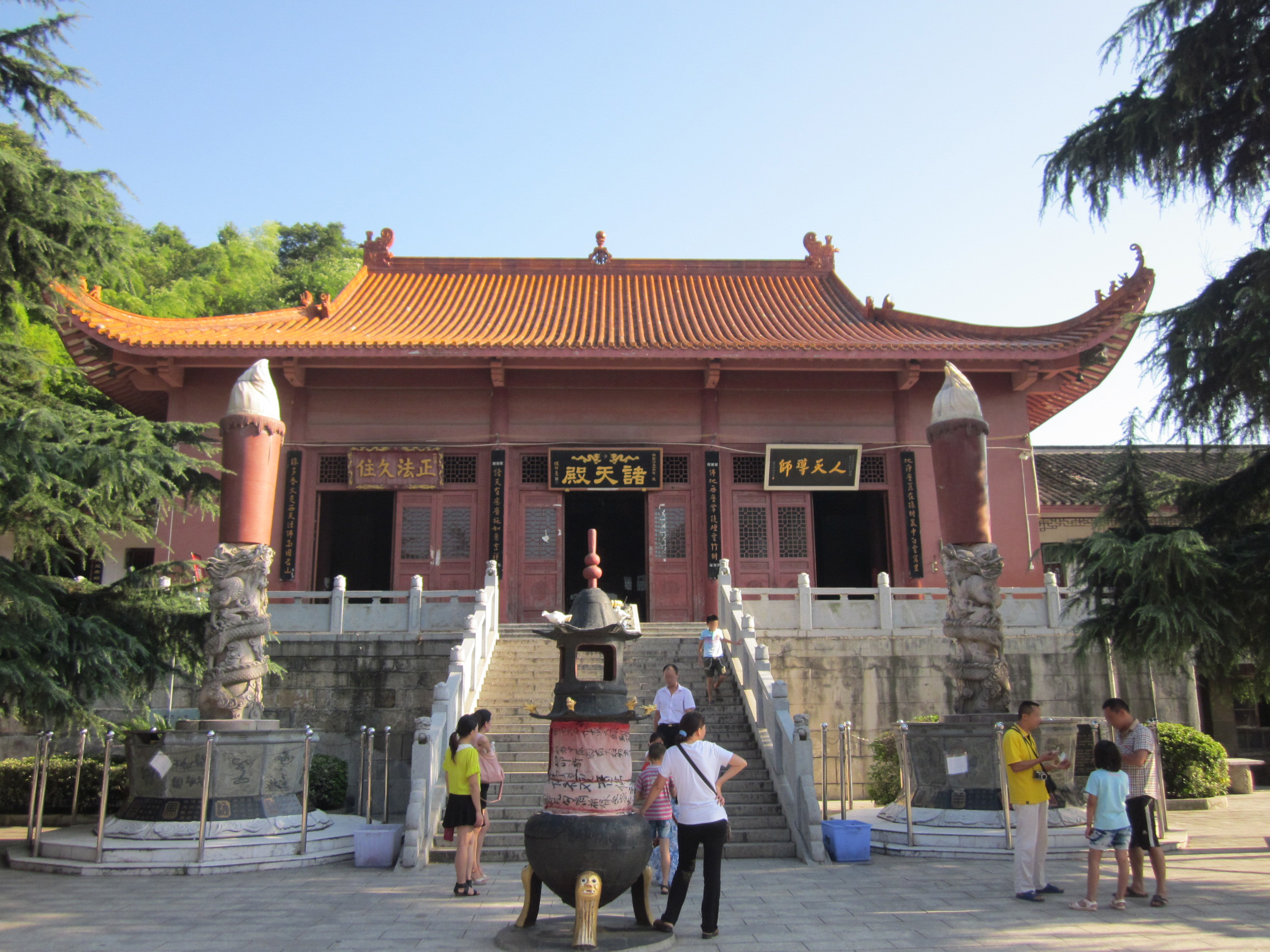
Hall of the Great Heroes, Baiyun Temple.

Baiyun Temple is a Buddhist temple on Huilong Mountain (回龙山) built during the Tang dynasty and later destroyed and rebuilt several times. The temple is where Mao Zedong carried out social research in 1917. Gautama Buddha is the main target of worship along with the Three Saints of the West, the Ksitigarbha, and the twenty four Heavens.
