= Daligang =

Daligang Town 大栗港镇
- Town
- Location in Hunan
- Coordinates: 28°29′02″N 111°53′16″E
- Country: People's Republic of China
- Province: Hunan
- Prefecture-level city: Yiyang
- County: Taojiang County

Area
  - Total: 171.4 km^{2} (66.2 sq mi)

Population
  - Total: 68,300
  - Density: 398/km^{2} (1,030/sq mi)
- Time zone: UTC+8 (China Standard)
- Area code: 0737

Daligang Town (simplified Chinese: 大栗港镇; traditional Chinese: 大栗港鎮; pinyin: Dàlìgǎng Zhèn) is an urban town in Taojiang County, Hunan Province, People's Republic of China.

== Administrative divisions ==
The town is divided into 23 villages and 1 community, which include the following areas: Yangjiazui Community, Qingshan Village, Huanglifu Village, Youjia Village, Niuti Village, Xingping Village, Hongyanzui Village, Jinpen Village, Zhujinba Village, Liujia Village, Huangdaolun Village, Wuyangping Village, Tongzishan Village, Zhujia Village, Demaoyuan Village, Daligang Village, Lishanhe Village, Beiji Village, Lujia Village, Songmuqiao Village, Tianjiaping Village, Paixingshang Village, Xianfengqiao Village, and Zhangjia Village (杨家嘴社区、青山村、黄栗洑村、游家村、牛蹄村、兴坪村、红岩嘴村、金盆村、筑金坝村、刘家村、黄道仑村、五羊坪村、童子山村、朱家村、德茂园村、大栗港村、栗山河村、碑矶村、卢家村、松木桥村、田家坪村、牌形上村、先锋桥村、张家村).
