= Zhanxi, Taojiang =

Zhanxi Town 沾溪镇
- Town
- Location in Hunan
- Coordinates: 28°33′44″N 111°58′54″E
- Country: People's Republic of China
- Province: Hunan
- Prefecture-level city: Yiyang
- County: Taojiang

Area
  - Total: 65 km^{2} (25 sq mi)

Population
  - Total: 27,800
  - Density: 430/km^{2} (1,100/sq mi)
- Time zone: UTC+8 (China Standard)
- Area code: 0737

Zhanxi Town (simplified Chinese: 沾溪镇; traditional Chinese: 沾溪鎮; pinyin: Zhānxī Zhèn) is an urban town in Taojiang County, Hunan Province, People's Republic of China.

== Administrative divisions ==
Zhanxi is divided into ten villages: Zhanxi Village, Jiuluofang Village, Wujiazhou Village, Yangquanwan Village, Changtianfang Village, Quanshuijing Village, Shuangtang Village, Weihong Village, Baishazhou Village, and Shamu Village (沾溪村、九螺坊村、伍家洲村、洋泉湾村、长田坊村、泉水井村、双塘村、卫红村、白沙洲村、杉木村).
