= Santangjie =

Santangjie Town 三堂街镇
- Town
- Location in Hunan
- Coordinates: 28°36′35″N 111°55′11″E
- Country: People's Republic of China
- Province: Hunan
- Prefecture-level city: Yiyang
- County: Taojiang

Area
  - Total: 145 km^{2} (56 sq mi)

Population
  - Total: 38,500
  - Density: 266/km^{2} (688/sq mi)
- Time zone: UTC+8 (China Standard)
- Area code: 0737

Santangjie Town (simplified Chinese: 三堂街镇; traditional Chinese: 三堂街鎮; pinyin: Sāntángjiē Zhèn) is an urban town in Taojiang County, Hunan Province, People's Republic of China.

== Administrative divisions ==
The town is divided into 18 villages and 1 community, which include the following areas: Santangjie Community, Jielongjie Village, Hulianping Village, Guojiazhou Village, Jingzhujie Village, Wanguhuimin Village, Heshuiqiao Village, Longjiaduan Village, Dawushan Village, Santangjie Village, Huaqiaoping Village, Longyaping Village, Hujia'ao Village, Jiufeng Village, Yantankou Village, Chitang Village, Wangmu Village, Tianzilun Village, and Wuqishan Village (三堂街社区、接龙桥村、湖莲坪村、郭家洲村、荆竹界村、晚谷回民村、合水桥村、龙家塅村、大屋山村、三堂街村、花桥坪回族村、龙牙坪村、胡家坳村、九峰村、沿潭口村、赤塘村、王母村、天子仑村、乌旗山村).
