= Wutan, Taojiang =

Wutan Town 武潭镇
- Town
- Location in Hunan
- Coordinates: 28°31′31″N 111°44′26″E
- Country: People's Republic of China
- Province: Hunan
- Prefecture-level city: Yiyang
- County: Taojiang

Area
  - Total: 220 km^{2} (85 sq mi)

Population
  - Total: 76,000
  - Density: 350/km^{2} (890/sq mi)
- Time zone: UTC+8 (China Standard)
- Area code: 0737

Wutan Town (simplified Chinese: 武潭镇; traditional Chinese: 武潭鎮; pinyin: Wǔtán Zhèn) is an urban town in Taojiang County, Hunan Province, People's Republic of China.

== Administrative divisions ==
The town is divided into 28 villages and 1 community, which include the following areas: Wutan Community, Qinpatian Village, Bajia Village, Fuzuwan Village, Yangjiaping Village, Longgongtan Village, Tangjiaduan Village, Nitan Village, Shanxi Village, Meilin Village, Gaofeng Village, Shiqiao Village, Xinpuzi Village, Chongshanping Village, Luojiaping Village, Niuxi Village, Xiongjia Village, Qingliang Village, Jigumiao Village, Yanjinqiao Village, Quetang'ao Village, Shashu Village, Wutan Village, Tianwan Village, Jingzhi Village, Lianhuacheng Village, and Biluo Village (武潭社区、勤耙田村、八家村、伏祖湾村、杨家坪村、龙拱滩村、汤家塅村、泥潭村、善溪村、梅林村、高峰村、石桥村、新铺子村、崇山坪村、罗家坪村、牛溪村、熊家村、清凉村、基固庙村、延津桥村、缺塘坳村、杉树村、武潭村、天湾村、景致村、莲花坪村、寨子村、莲花城村、碧螺村).
