= Lucidu =

Lucidu Town 鸬鹚渡镇
- Town
- Location in Hunan
- Coordinates: 28°28′28″N 111°57′38″E
- Country: People's Republic of China
- Province: Hunan
- Prefecture-level city: Yiyang
- County: Taojiang

Area
  - Total: 109 km^{2} (42 sq mi)

Population
  - Total: 3,260
  - Density: 29.9/km^{2} (77.5/sq mi)
- Time zone: UTC+8 (China Standard)
- Area code: 0737

Lucidu Town (simplified Chinese: 鸬鹚渡镇; traditional Chinese: 鸕鷀渡鎮; pinyin: Lúcídù Zhèn) is an urban town in Taojiang County, Hunan Province, People's Republic of China.

== Administrative divisions ==
The town is divided into 15 villages and 1 community, which include the following areas: Shahe Community, Huaqiao Village, Dajiang Village, Banxi Village, Yuxi Village, Meishan Village, Qiaogongba Village, Xuetangwan Village, Qingtang Village, Changjiang Village, Lucidu Village, Baimu Village, Datang Village, Longtangwan Village, Shilongtang Village, and Fengjingsi Village (沙河社区、花桥村、大江村、板溪村、玉溪村、梅山村、千功坝村、学堂湾村、清塘村、长江村、鸬鹚渡村、百亩村、大塘村、龙塘湾村、石龙塘村、风景寺村).
