= Majitang =

Town in Taojiang County, Hunan, China

Majitang Town 马迹塘镇
- Town
- Location in Hunan
- Coordinates: 28°28′24″N 111°45′46″E
- Country: People's Republic of China
- Province: Hunan
- Prefecture-level city: Yiyang
- County: Taojiang

Area
  - Total: 167 km^{2} (64 sq mi)

Population
  - Total: 39,260
  - Density: 235/km^{2} (609/sq mi)
- Time zone: UTC+8 (China Standard)
- Area code: 0737

Majitang Town (simplified Chinese: 马迹塘镇; traditional Chinese: 馬跡塘鎮; pinyin: Mǎjìtáng Zhèn) is an urban town in Taojiang County, Hunan Province, People's Republic of China.

== Administrative divisions ==
The town is divided into 27 villages and 1 community, which include the following areas: Tianfumiao Community, Fengxi Village, Majitang Village, Datangping Village, Sanli Village, Jiugangshan Village, Xintang Village, Jiugangduan Village, Longxi Village, Zhangjiafang Village, Yijiafang Village, Jinghua Village, Baile Village, Yafeng Village, Silihe Village, Lumalun Village, Luojiazhou Village, Nanshandong Village, Shimen Village, Fanjiayuan Village, Lucidu Village, Duanshi Village, Jintang Village, Baihe Village, Xunyuxi Village, Shuangjiangkou Village, Tanjiayuan Village, and Yuexingwan Village (天府庙社区、丰溪村、马迹塘村、大塘坪村、三里村、九岗山村、新塘村、九岗塅村、龙溪村、张家坊村、易家坊村、京华村、百乐村、丫峰村、泗里河村、鹿马仑村、罗家洲村、南山洞村、石门村、范家园村、鸬鹚湾村、塅石村、金塘村、百合村、浔渔溪村、双江口村、谈家园村、月形湾村).
