= Huangcai Reservoir =

- Qingyang Lake
- 黄材水库 (Chinese)
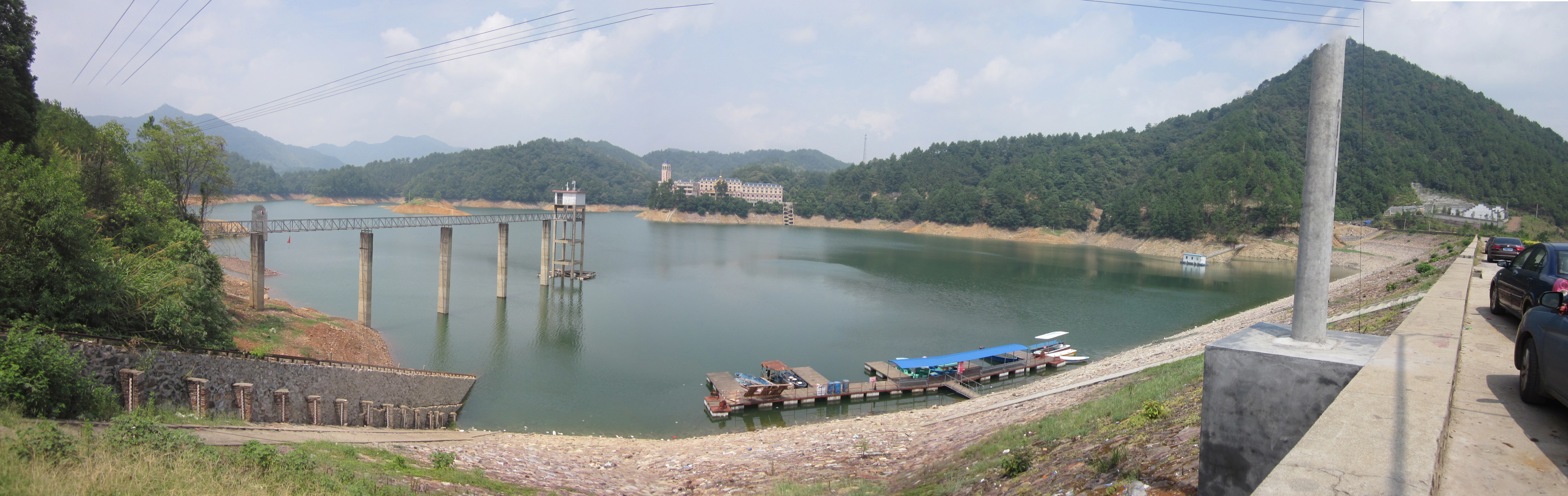
- Huangcai Reservoir

- Location within Hunan
- Location: Huangcai Town, Ningxiang City, Hunan
- Coordinates: 28°09′04″N 112°03′43″E
- Type: Reservoir
- Primary outflows: Wei River
- Basin countries: China
- Built: September 1958
- First flooded: 1965
- Surface area: 240.8 square kilometres (93.0 sq mi)
- Water volume: 147 million cubic metres (39×10^{9} US gal)

The Huangcai Reservoir (simplified Chinese: 黄材水库; traditional Chinese: 黃材水庫; pinyin: Huángcái Shuǐkù), also known as Qingyang Lake (Chinese: 青羊湖) is a large reservoir located in the northwestern part of Ningxiang in the province of Hunan, China. It is the largest body of water in Ningxiang and the largest reservoir in Ningxiang. The reservoir is the source of the Wei River. It cost about RMB 5,393,300,000.

Created by damming some small rivers, Huangcai Reservoir, with an area of 240.8 square kilometres (59,500 acres), the reservoir has a capacity of 147,000,000 cubic metres (39×10^{9} US gal).

== History ==
In 1949, the People's Government of Ningxiang, planned to build a reservoir for irrigation, flood control, electricity generation and fish farming.

In 1952, scientists started to survey the boundaries of a piece of land in Huangcai Town. In 1957, scientists started designing it. In May 1958, the construction work started. On 9 May 1961, the President of China Liu Shaoqi and his wife Wang Guangmei, General Gan Siqi and his wife Li Zhen, the secretary of agriculture minister Liao Luyan, Xu Teli, the interior minister Xie Juezai, and the provincial party secretary Zhou Xiaozhou took part in labour.

In May 1965, the government mobilized a large amount of human labor to complete the project.

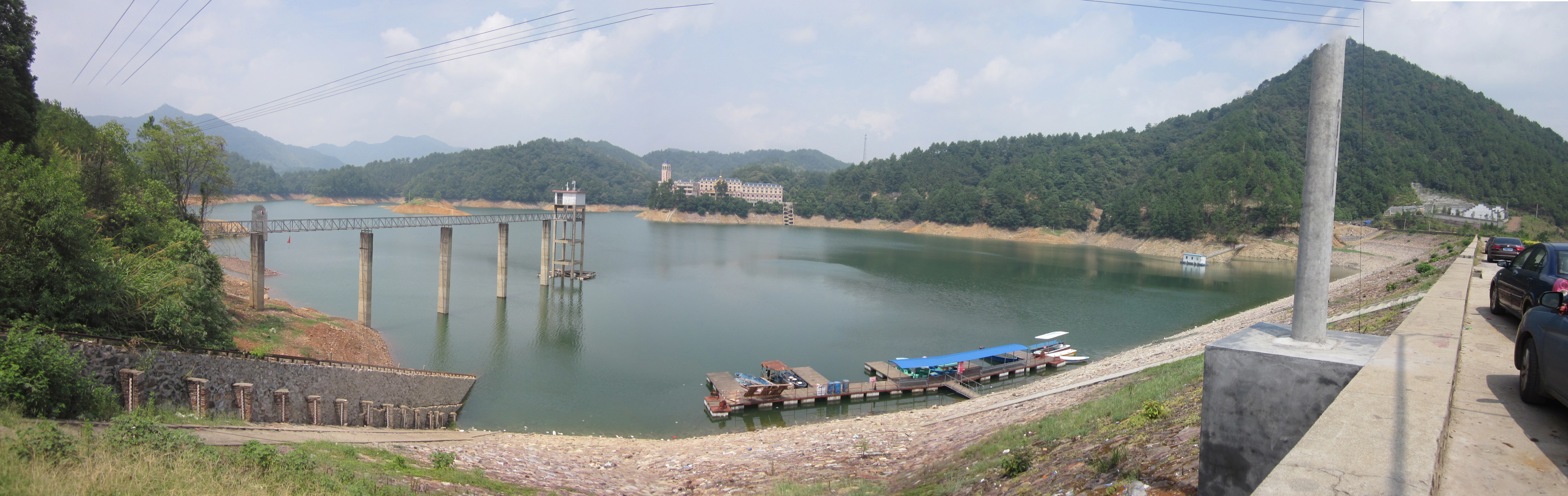
Huangcai Reservoir
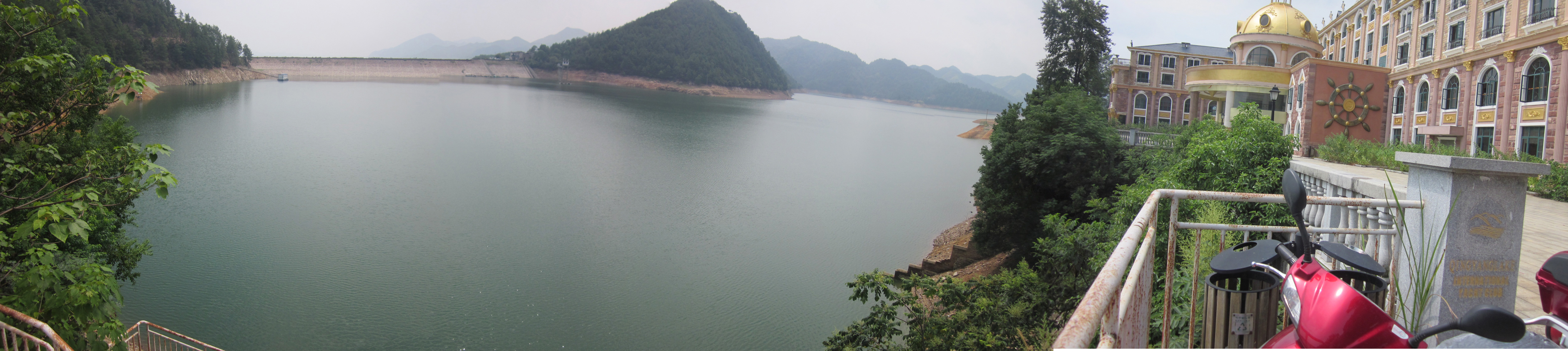
Huangcai Reservoir
