= Niutian, Taojiang =

Niutian Town 牛田镇
- Town
- Location in Hunan
- Coordinates: 28°22′31″N 112°10′09″E
- Country: People's Republic of China
- Province: Hunan
- Prefecture-level city: Yiyang
- County: Taojiang

Area
  - Total: 73.88 km^{2} (28.53 sq mi)

Population
  - Total: 34,650
  - Density: 469.0/km^{2} (1,215/sq mi)
- Time zone: UTC+8 (China Standard)
- Area code: 0737

Niutian Town (simplified Chinese: 牛田镇; traditional Chinese: 牛田鎮; pinyin: Niútián Zhèn) is an urban town in Taojiang County, Hunan Province, People's Republic of China.

== Administrative divisions ==
The town is divided into 15 villages and 1 community, which include the following areas: Shuangjiangkou Community, Jinguangshan Village, Shashulun Village, Taoren Village, Linshijie Village, Niutian Village, Xiaowu Village, Qingtang Village, Zhushushan Village, Jinfengshan Village, Xiaojiachong Village, Anshan Village, Guanzhuang Village, Xiashankou Village, Santangwan Village, and Gusha Village (双江口社区、金光山村、杉树仑村、桃仁村、临市街村、牛田村、小坞村、清塘村、株树山村、金凤山村、肖家冲村、鞍山村、观庄村、峡山口村、三塘湾村、古杉村).
