= Zhabu, Taojiang =

Zhabu Hui Ethnic Township 鲊埠回族乡
- Township
- Location in Hunan
- Coordinates: 28°33′44″N 111°49′06″E
- Country: People's Republic of China
- Province: Hunan
- Prefecture-level city: Yiyang
- County: Taojiang

Area
  - Total: 48 km^{2} (19 sq mi)

Population
  - Total: 18,970
  - Density: 400/km^{2} (1,000/sq mi)
- Time zone: UTC+8 (China Standard)
- Area code: 0737

Zhabu Hui Ethnic Township (simplified Chinese: 鲊埠回族乡; traditional Chinese: 鮓埠回族鄉; pinyin: zhǎbù huízú xiāng) is a rural ethnic township in Taojiang County, Hunan Province, People's Republic of China.

== Administrative divisions ==
The township is divided into 9 villages and 1 community, which include the following areas: Zhabu Community, Chemenduan Village, Huayuantai Village, Jungongzui Village, Dashuitian Village, Jiangjiaba Village, Nanjingwan Village, Yanxi Village, Taogongmiao Village, and Zhujilun Village (鲊埠社区、车门塅村、花园台村、军功嘴村、大水田村、江家坝村、南京湾村、颜溪村、陶公庙村、筑基仑村).
