= Ningxiang No. 7 High School =

- 宁乡市第七中高级中学

Location
- Liushahe, Ningxiang, Hunan, China; 410635
- Coordinates: 27°59′53″N 112°06′43″E

Information
- Former name: Linshan Academy; Linshan School; Fusi Gaoxiao; Linshan Primary School
- Type: Comprehensive Public High School
- Motto: 文明，求实，勤奋，进取 (Civilized, Realistic, Diligent, Enterprising)
- Established: 1923
- Founders: Wang Lingbo; Zhang Zhutao; He Lixuan
- Principal: Xie Hainan (谢海南)
- Faculty: 67
- Grades: 10 to 12
- Gender: Coed
- Enrollment: 1000
- Classes: 17
- Campus size: 46,666.67 square metres (502,315.9 sq ft)
- Campus type: Suburban
- Song: Chasing the Sun (《追赶太阳》)
- Affiliation: Ningxiang Municipal Bureau of Education
- Website: hnnxqz.30dao.cn/Article/2588e935-347b-94bf-3483-5fface008ba0/

Ningxiang No. 7 High School (simplified Chinese: 宁乡市第七中高级中学; traditional Chinese: 寧鄉市第七高級中學; pinyin: Níngxiāngshì Dìqī Gāojí Zhōngxué), commonly abbreviated as (Ningxiang) Qizhong (宁乡七中; 寧鄉七中; Níngxiāng Qīzhōng), is a public coeducational high school in Liushahe Town of Ningxiang, Hunan, China.

== History ==
Ningxiang No. 7 High school traces its origins to the former Linshan Academy (林山书院), founded by Wang Lingbo (王凌波), Zhang Zhutao (张铸陶) and He Lixuan (何立璇) in 1923, and Wang served as its principal.

In 1926, Niangxiang No. 6 School (宁乡第六高小) was merged into Linshan Academy.

In early 1930s, He Shuheng and Mei Yecheng (梅冶成) disseminated Marxism-Leninism among the students.

After the establishment of the Communist State in 1949, it was changed to be a modern school initially called Fusi Wanxiao (罘罳高小) and then was renamed Linshan Primary School (林山完小) in 1955.

On April 8, 1958, the school changed its name as Ningxiang No. 7 Middle School.

In 1970, Ningxiang No. 7 Middle School was renamed Ningxiang No. 7 High School.

== Athletics ==
- Basketball (men's and women's)
- Football (women's)

== Notable alumni ==
- Hu Changsheng, major general of the PLA Air Force in Guangzhou Military Region.
- Tang Sulan, Children's literature writer.
- He Jiyuan, major general of Kuomintang Army.
- Yu Jixin, People's Daily reporter, teacher at Jinan University.
- Chen Huifang, Hunan Daily reporter.
- Luo Huizhong, professor at Central South University.
- Li Guiping, professor at Central South University.
- Chen Yuetang, vice-president of Hunan Agricultural University.
- Yu Jifan, associate professor at Xiangtan University.
- Liu Shuiming, deputy director of International Department of Hunan Daily.
- Li Ailian, director of Ningxiang Municipal Bureau of Education.
- Luo Guoyang, professor at Yale University.
- Luo Xixian, professor at Dalian Maritime University.
- Yu Xiaojian, director of Yuhua District Education Bureau.
- Chen Zhihua, researcher at State Oceanic Administration.

== Gallery ==
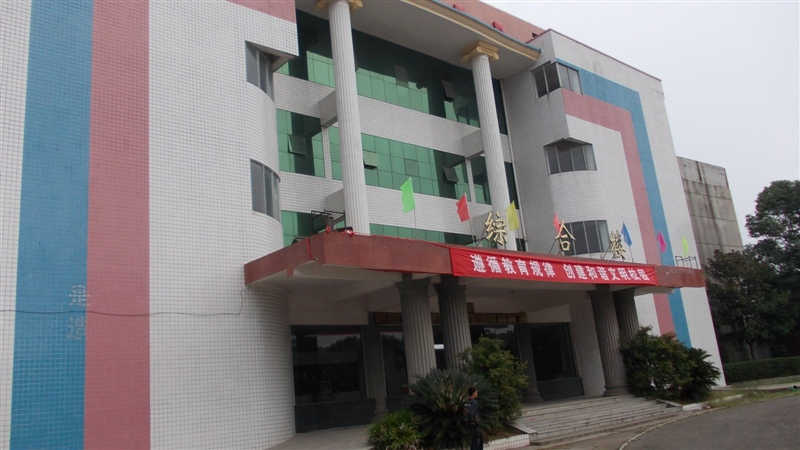
Comprehensive Building.

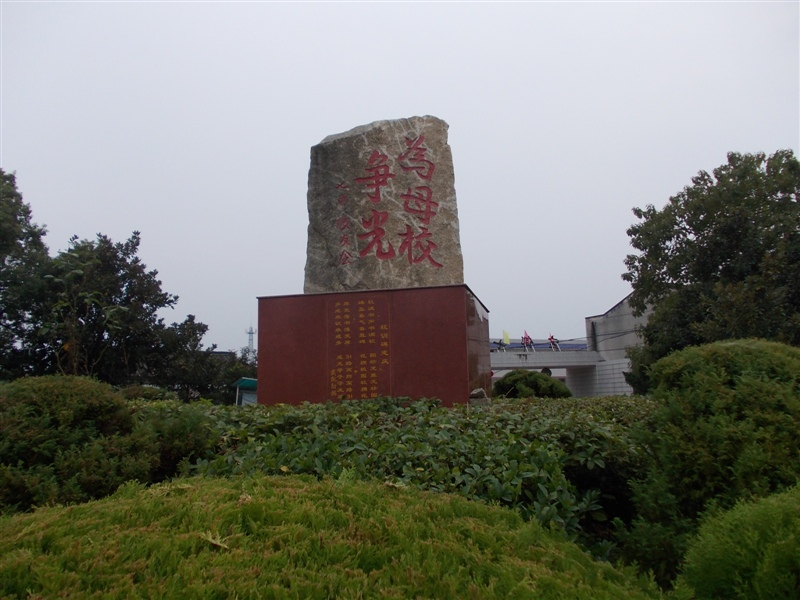
A stone tablet.

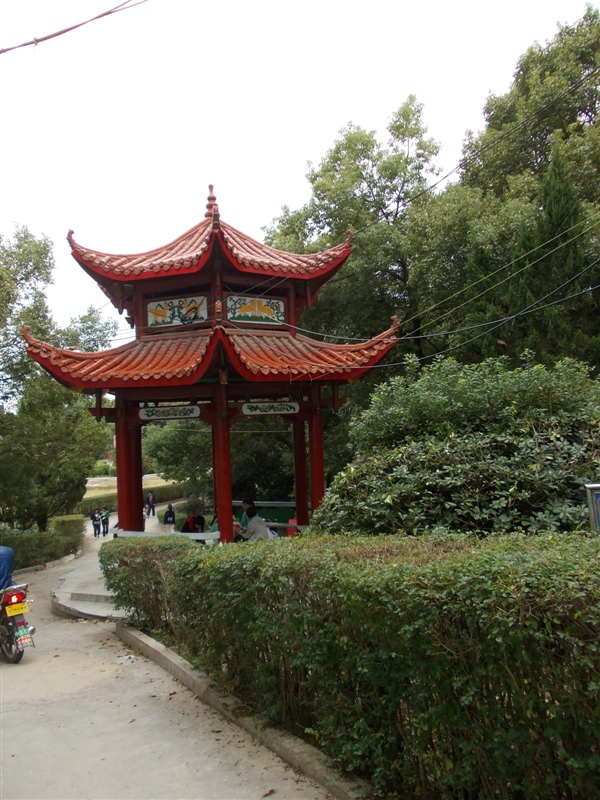
Zunshi Pavilion (尊师亭).
