= Songmutang =

Songmutang Town 松木塘镇
- Town
- Location in Hunan
- Coordinates: 28°19′12″N 112°03′24″E
- Country: People's Republic of China
- Province: Hunan
- Prefecture-level city: Yiyang
- County: Taojiang

Area
  - Total: 228 km^{2} (88 sq mi)

Population
  - Total: 36,900
  - Density: 162/km^{2} (419/sq mi)
- Time zone: UTC+8 (China Standard)
- Area code: 0737

Songmutang Town (simplified Chinese: 松木塘镇; traditional Chinese: 松木塘鎮; pinyin: Sōngmùtáng Zhèn) is an urban town in Taojiang County, Hunan Province, People's Republic of China.

== Administrative divisions ==
The town is divided into 16 villages and 2 communities, which include the following areas: Chuanmenwan Community, Taohuahu Community, Guanshankou Village, Xiagansha Village, Wentang Village, Longtang Village, Sanjietang Village, Zhangxi Village, Zhushan Village, Cangxiaduan Village, Qiaotouhe Village, Xiangtaoyuan Village, Nanhechong Village, Ziliangyan Village, Houjiashan Village, Songmutang Village, Tianzishan Village, and Longshanwan Village (川门湾社区、桃花湖社区、关山口村、下干砂村、温塘村、龙塘村、三节塘村、樟溪村、竹山村、苍霞塅村、桥头河村、响涛园村、南河冲村、子良岩村、猴家山村、松木塘村、天子山村、龙山湾村).
