= Shiniujiang =

Shiniujiang Town 石牛江镇
- Town
- Location in Hunan
- Coordinates: 28°26′06″N 112°09′17″E
- Country: People's Republic of China
- Province: Hunan
- Prefecture-level city: Yiyang
- County: Taojiang

Area
  - Total: 65 km^{2} (25 sq mi)

Population
  - Total: 34,650
  - Density: 530/km^{2} (1,400/sq mi)
- Time zone: UTC+8 (China Standard)
- Area code: 0737

Shiniujiang Town (simplified Chinese: 石牛江镇; traditional Chinese: 石牛江鎮; pinyin: Shíniújiāng Zhèn) is an urban town in Taojiang County, Hunan Province, People's Republic of China.

== Administrative divisions ==
The town is divided into 15 villages and 1 community, which include the following areas: Youfusha Community, Jiujiaduan Village, Hejiatang Village, Shiniujiang Village, Chechong Village, Shangqili Village, Zengtang Village, Anlingping Village, Xiaopotou Village, Niujianqiao Village, Huatiaochong Village, Huazilu Village, Changchong Village, Huangnitian Village, Tianzhuangwan Village, and Sutuan Village (游伏沙社区、九家塅村、贺家塘村、石牛江村、车冲村、上七里村、增塘村、安陵坪村、小坡头村、牛剑桥村、花田冲村、化字炉村、长冲村、黄泥田村、田庄湾村、苏团村).
