= Taojiang County =

Taojiang County 桃江县
- County
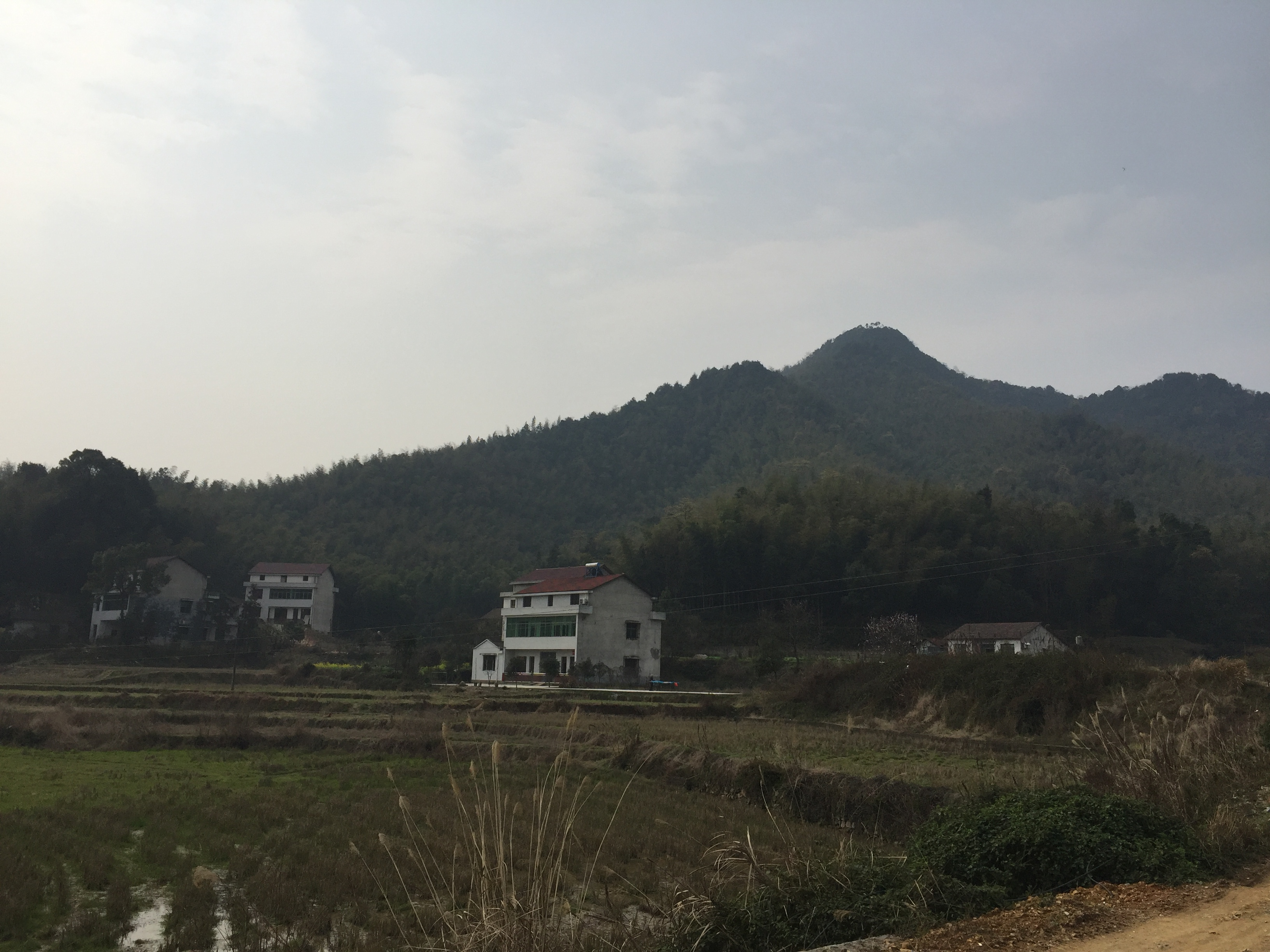

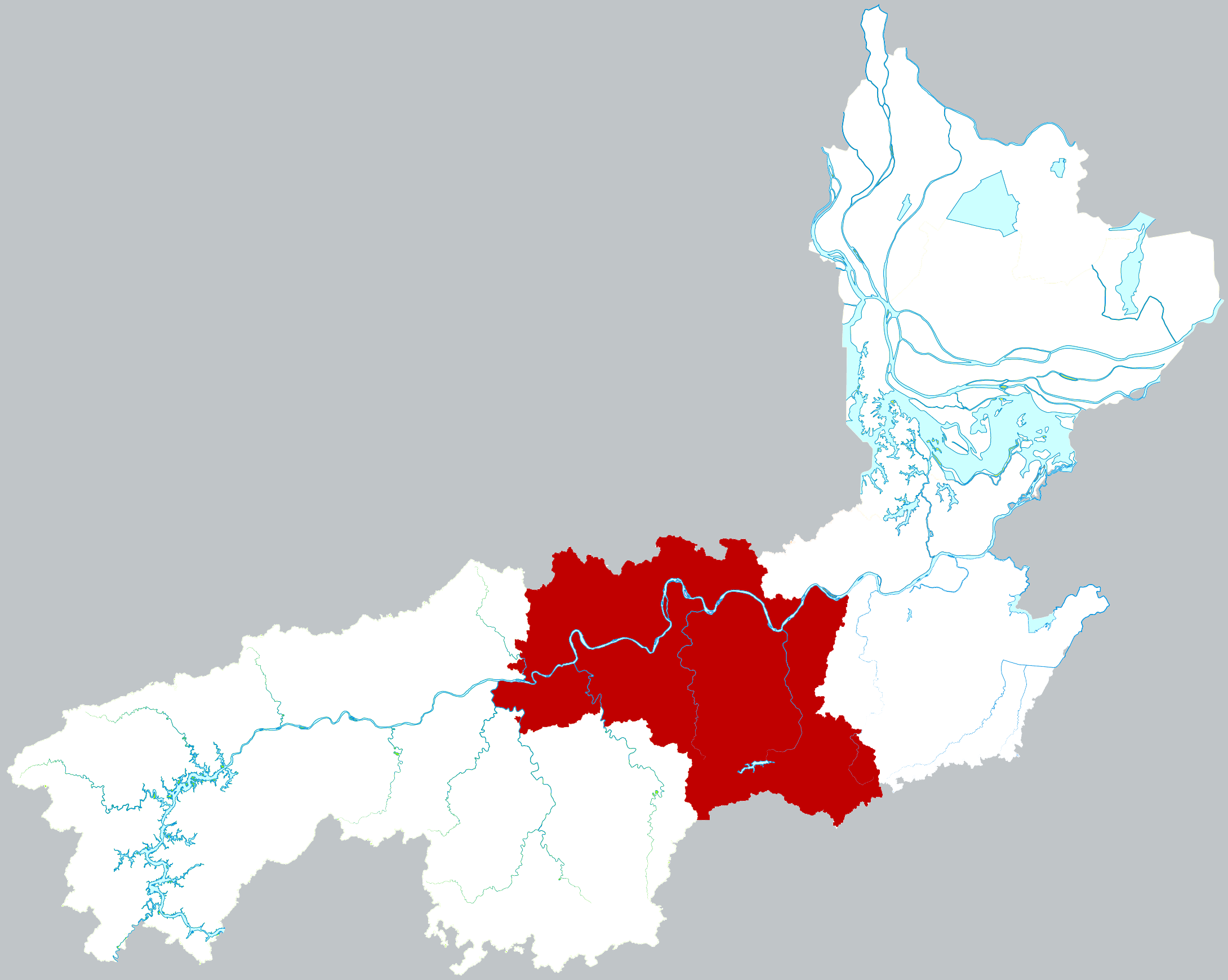
- Location of Taojiang County within Yiyang

- Location in Hunan
- Coordinates: 28°26′38″N 111°57′54″E
- Country: People's Republic of China
- Province: Hunan
- Prefecture-level city: Yiyang

Area
  - Total: 2,068.14 km^{2} (798.51 sq mi)

Population
  - Total: 769,568
  - Density: 372.106/km^{2} (963.751/sq mi)
- Time zone: UTC+8 (China Standard)

Taojiang County (simplified Chinese: 桃江县; traditional Chinese: 桃江縣; pinyin: Táojiāng Xiàn) is a county in the Province of Hunan, China. It is under the administration of Yiyang Prefecture-level City.

Located in the north central part of the province, the county is bordered to the north by Hanshou County and Dingcheng District of Changde City, to the east by Ziyang and Heshan Districts, to the south by Ningxiang County, and to the west by Anhua County. Taojiang County covers an area of 2,068.35 km^{2} (798.59 sq mi), and as of 2015, it had a registered population of 888,400 and a permanent resident population of 792,300. The county has 12 towns and 3 townships under its jurisdiction, and the county seat is Taohuajiang (桃花江镇).

== Administrative divisions ==
According to the result on adjustment of township-level divisions of Taojiang County in 2005, Taojiang County has 15 township-level divisions under its jurisdiction; and Zhanxi Township was renamed as Zhanxi Town in 2011, Taojiang County has 12 towns and 3 townships under its jurisdiction. They are:

=== Towns ===
- Daligang (大栗港镇)
- Huishangang (灰山港镇)
- Lucidu (鸬鹚渡镇)
- Majitang (马迹塘镇)
- Niutian (牛田镇)
- Santangjie (三堂街镇)
- Shiniujiang (石牛江镇)
- Songmutang (松木塘镇)
- Taohuajiang (桃花江镇)
- Wutan (武潭镇)
- Xiushan (修山镇)
- Zhanxi (沾溪镇): Zhanxi Township (沾溪乡) was renamed Zhanxi Town of the present name (沾溪镇) in 2011.

=== Townships ===
- Fuqiushan (浮丘山乡)
- Gaoqiao (高桥乡)
- Zhabu (鲊埠回族乡)

== Climate ==
Climate data for Taojiang, elevation 137 m (449 ft), (1991–2020 normals, extremes 1981–2010)
| Month | Jan | Feb | Mar | Apr | May | Jun | Jul | Aug | Sep | Oct | Nov | Dec | Year |
|---|---|---|---|---|---|---|---|---|---|---|---|---|---|
| Record high °C (°F) | 24.4 (75.9) | 29.5 (85.1) | 32.9 (91.2) | 36.1 (97.0) | 36.1 (97.0) | 37.8 (100.0) | 39.6 (103.3) | 39.8 (103.6) | 37.8 (100.0) | 35.9 (96.6) | 31.2 (88.2) | 25.2 (77.4) | 39.8 (103.6) |
| Mean daily maximum °C (°F) | 8.7 (47.7) | 11.5 (52.7) | 16.2 (61.2) | 22.4 (72.3) | 26.8 (80.2) | 29.8 (85.6) | 33.0 (91.4) | 32.4 (90.3) | 28.1 (82.6) | 22.8 (73.0) | 17.3 (63.1) | 11.4 (52.5) | 21.7 (71.1) |
| Daily mean °C (°F) | 4.8 (40.6) | 7.4 (45.3) | 11.5 (52.7) | 17.5 (63.5) | 22.0 (71.6) | 25.5 (77.9) | 28.5 (83.3) | 27.7 (81.9) | 23.2 (73.8) | 17.7 (63.9) | 12.2 (54.0) | 6.9 (44.4) | 17.1 (62.7) |
| Mean daily minimum °C (°F) | 2.0 (35.6) | 4.3 (39.7) | 8.1 (46.6) | 13.7 (56.7) | 18.3 (64.9) | 22.2 (72.0) | 25.0 (77.0) | 24.3 (75.7) | 19.8 (67.6) | 14.3 (57.7) | 8.8 (47.8) | 3.7 (38.7) | 13.7 (56.7) |
| Record low °C (°F) | −8.2 (17.2) | −7.9 (17.8) | −2.9 (26.8) | 1.7 (35.1) | 9.0 (48.2) | 12.6 (54.7) | 18.8 (65.8) | 16.8 (62.2) | 11.1 (52.0) | 1.3 (34.3) | −2.1 (28.2) | −9.9 (14.2) | −9.9 (14.2) |
| Average precipitation mm (inches) | 80.5 (3.17) | 90.0 (3.54) | 150.6 (5.93) | 179.2 (7.06) | 208.3 (8.20) | 239.8 (9.44) | 202.3 (7.96) | 153.7 (6.05) | 108.1 (4.26) | 93.3 (3.67) | 87.6 (3.45) | 58.1 (2.29) | 1,651.5 (65.02) |
| Average precipitation days (≥ 0.1 mm) | 13.3 | 13.8 | 17.0 | 16.5 | 15.9 | 15.6 | 12.2 | 12.2 | 11.3 | 11.8 | 11.1 | 10.8 | 161.5 |
| Average snowy days | 5.4 | 2.7 | 0.8 | 0 | 0 | 0 | 0 | 0 | 0 | 0 | 0.1 | 1.7 | 10.7 |
| Average relative humidity (%) | 81 | 80 | 81 | 79 | 80 | 84 | 80 | 81 | 83 | 83 | 82 | 79 | 81 |
| Mean monthly sunshine hours | 60.2 | 61.1 | 80.1 | 104.7 | 122.2 | 112.6 | 181.6 | 168.9 | 121.7 | 105.0 | 96.6 | 85.0 | 1,299.7 |
| Percentage possible sunshine | 19 | 19 | 21 | 27 | 29 | 27 | 43 | 42 | 33 | 30 | 30 | 27 | 29 |
Source: China Meteorological Administration
