= Gaoqiao, Taojiang =

Gaoqiao Township 高桥乡
- Township
- Location in Hunan
- Coordinates: 28°25′08″N 112°03′56″E
- Country: People's Republic of China
- Province: Hunan
- Prefecture-level city: Yiyang
- County: Taojiang County

Area
  - Total: 96 km^{2} (37 sq mi)

Population
  - Total: 3,075
  - Density: 32/km^{2} (83/sq mi)
- Time zone: UTC+8 (China Standard)
- Area code: 0737

Gaoqiao Township (simplified Chinese: 高桥乡; traditional Chinese: 高橋鄉; pinyin: Gāoqiáo Xiāng) is a rural township in Taojiang County, Hunan Province, People's Republic of China.

== Administrative divisions ==
The township is divided into 12 villages, which include the following areas: Hengmatang Village, Shitouping Village, Shijingtou Village, Zhaojiashan Village, Songbai Village, Longtanqiao Village, Luoxi Village, Gaoqiao Village, Heyetang Village, Xiaoshanwan Village, Qianqiu Village, and Dalin Village (横马塘村、石头坪村、石井头村、赵家山村、松柏村、龙潭桥村、罗溪村、高桥村、荷叶塘村、小山湾村、千秋村、大林村).
