= Fuqiushan =

Fuqiushan Township 浮丘山乡
- Township
- Location in Hunan
- Coordinates: 28°28′43″N 112°04′13″E
- Country: People's Republic of China
- Province: Hunan
- Prefecture-level city: Yiyang
- County: Taojiang County

Area
  - Total: 60 km^{2} (23 sq mi)

Population
  - Total: 26,500
  - Density: 440/km^{2} (1,100/sq mi)
- Time zone: UTC+8 (China Standard)
- Area code: 0737

Fuqiushan Township (simplified Chinese: 浮丘山乡; traditional Chinese: 浮丘山鄉; pinyin: Fúqiūshān Xiāng) is a rural township in Taojiang County, Hunan Province, People's Republic of China.

== Administrative divisions ==
The township is divided into 20 villages, which include the following areas: Jinlun Village, Maojiaqiao Village, Zhimushan Village, Renxingshan Village, Huilongwan Village, Xinqiao Village, Shatianwan Village, Qixin Village, Xifengsi Village, Fuqiushan Village, Dashuidong Village, Tanshanqiao Village, Hongqiaotou Village, Jinpai Village, Huangheqiao Village, Tianjiachong Village, Huangnanchong Village, Baijiahe Village, Danshuiba Village, and Jinpan Village (近仑村、毛家桥村、枳木山村、人形山村、回龙湾村、新桥村、沙田湾村、齐心村、西峰寺村、浮邱山村、大水洞村、炭山桥村、洪桥头村、禁牌村、黄鹤桥村、田家冲村、黄南冲村、白家河村、担水坝村、金盘村).
