= Xiushan, Taojiang =

Xiushan Town 修山镇
- Town
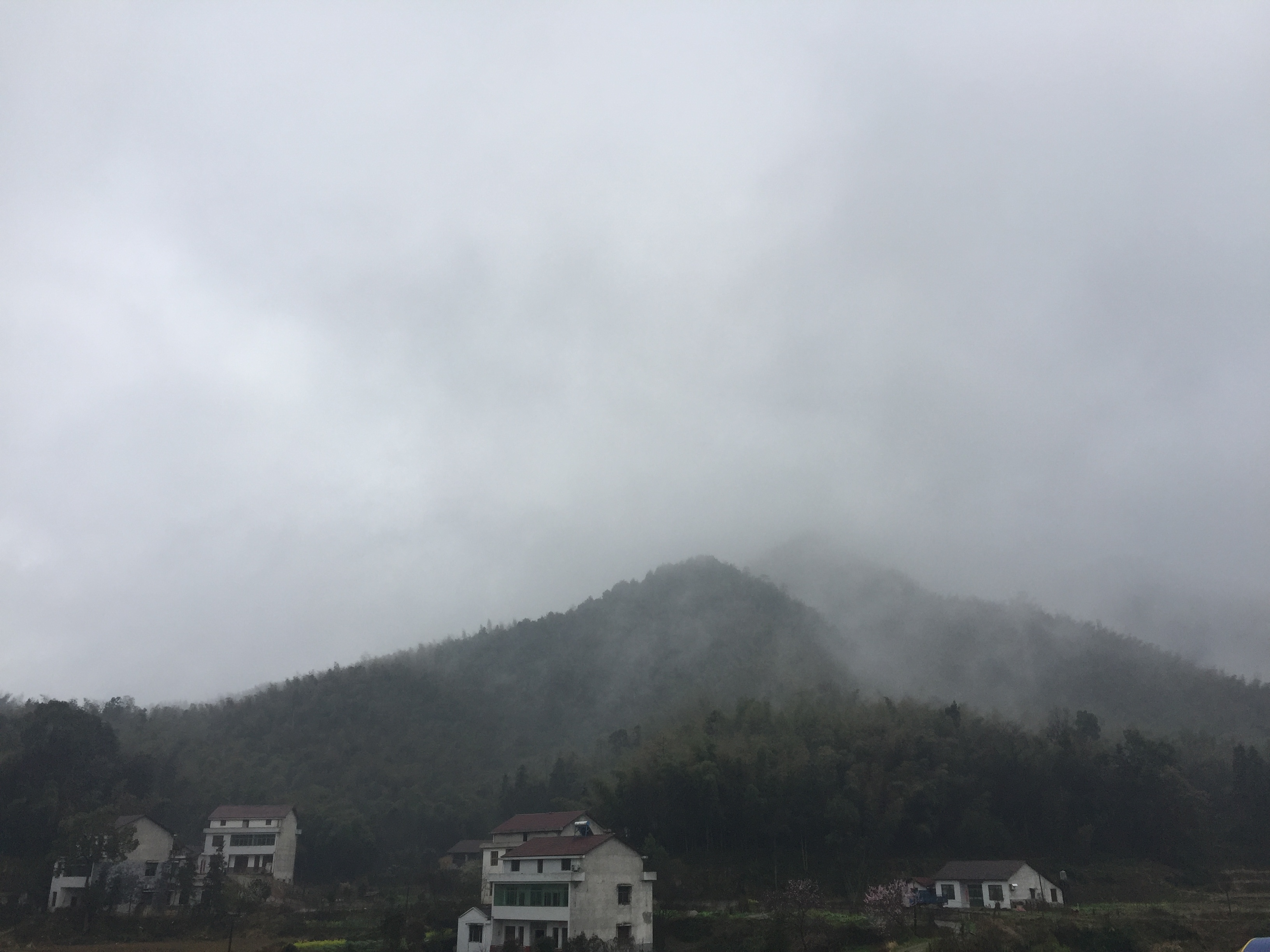

- Location in Hunan
- Coordinates: 28°35′40″N 112°01′50″E
- Country: People's Republic of China
- Province: Hunan
- Prefecture-level city: Yiyang
- County: Taojiang

Area
  - Total: 93 km^{2} (36 sq mi)

Population
  - Total: 33,800
  - Density: 360/km^{2} (940/sq mi)
- Time zone: UTC+8 (China Standard)
- Area code: 0737

Xiushan Town (simplified Chinese: 修山镇; traditional Chinese: 修山鎮; pinyin: Xiūshān Zhèn) is an urban town in Taojiang County, Hunan Province, People's Republic of China.

== Administrative divisions ==
The town is divided into 11 villages and 2 communities, which include the following areas: Xiushan Community, Zoujiawan Community, Lianpenzui Village, Mazhuyuan Village, Hongshan Village, Shutang Village, Xiushan Village, Badu Village, Sanguanqiao Village, Jiudu Village, Huaqiaogang Village, Kangjiachong Village, and Yuemingshan Village (修山社区、邹家湾社区、连盆嘴村、麻竹垸村、洪山村、舒塘村、修山村、八都村、三官桥村、九都村、花桥港村、康家冲村、月明山村).
