= Liushahe =

Liushahe 流沙河镇
- Town
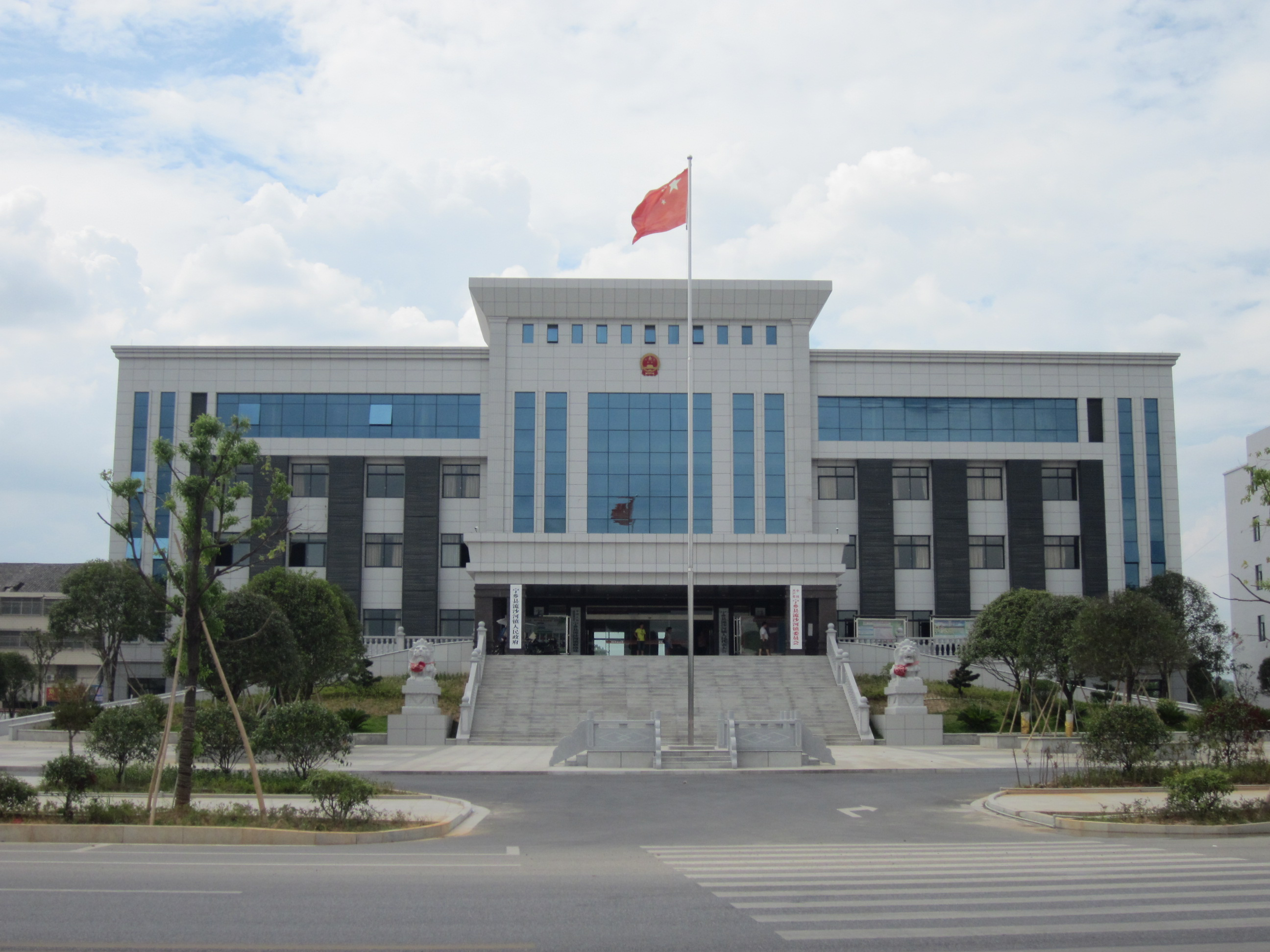
- Government building of Liushahe Town.
- Etymology: 流沙, liúshā ("quicksand"); 河, hé ("river")
- Location in Hunan.
- Coordinates: 27°59′32″N 112°06′08″E
- Country: People's Republic of China
- Province: Hunan
- Prefecture-level city: Changsha
- County-level city: Ningxiang

Area
  - Total: 140.57 km^{2} (54.27 sq mi)

Population (2007)
  - Total: 69,000
  - Density: 490/km^{2} (1,300/sq mi)
- Time zone: UTC+08:00 (China Standard)
- Postal code: 410635
- Area code: 0731
- Website: www.nxcity.gov.cn/lshz/index.htm

Chinese name
- Traditional Chinese: 流沙河鎮
- Simplified Chinese: 流沙河镇
Transcriptions
Standard Mandarin
- Hanyu Pinyin: Liúshāhé

Liushahe (Chinese: 流沙河镇) is a town in Ningxiang, Hunan, China. It is surrounded by Qingshanqiao Town on the west, Huangcai Town and Shatian Township on the north, Laoliangcang Town and Huitang Town on the east, and Fanjiang Town on the south. As of the 2007 census it had a population of 68,780 and an area of 140.57 square kilometres (54.27 sq mi).

== Administrative divisions ==
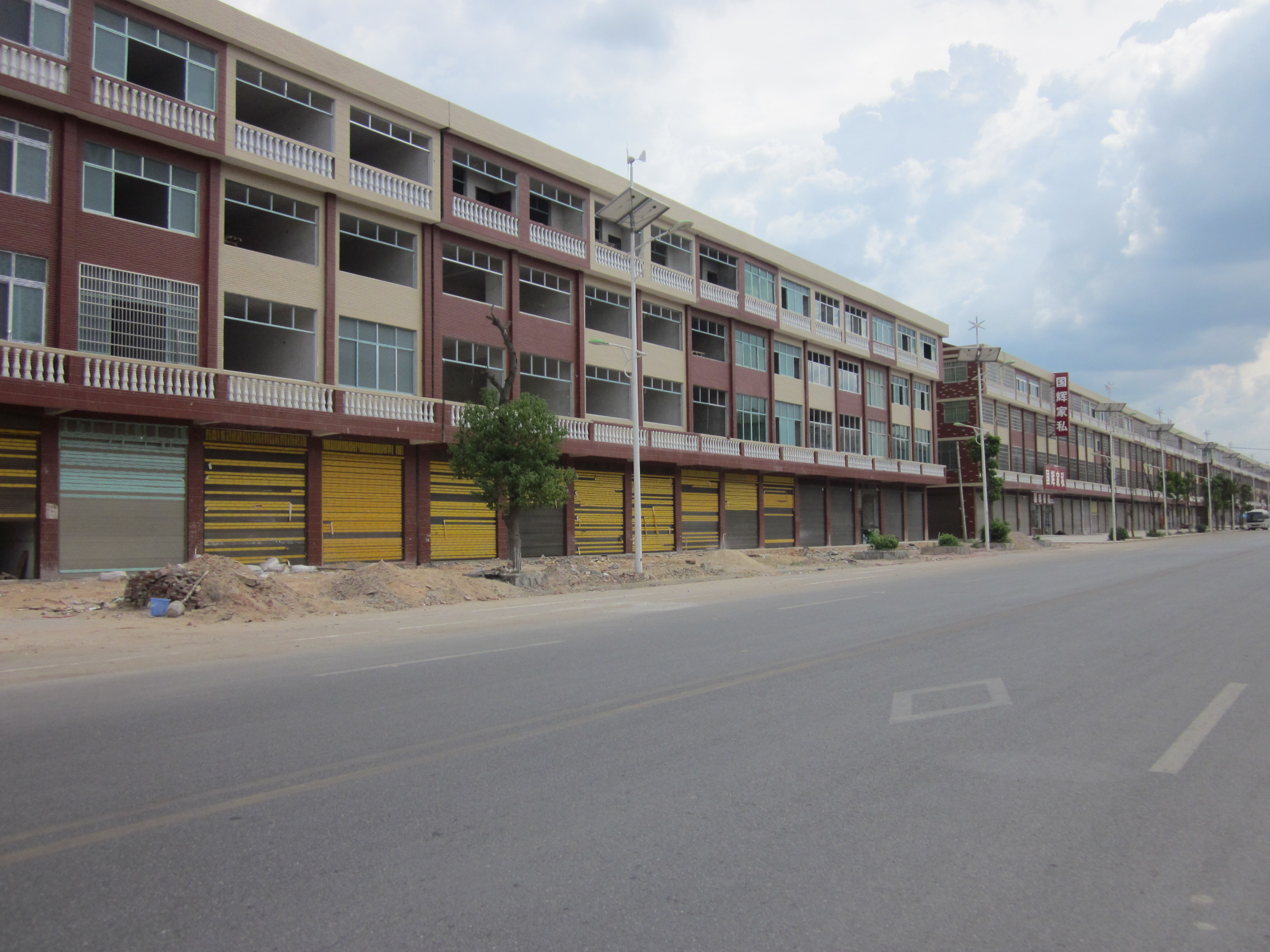
Buildings in Liushahe Town.

The town is divided into 11 villages and two communities:

- Liushahe Community (流沙河社区)
- Helin Community (荷林社区)
- Caochong (草冲村)
- Fuchong (扶冲村)
- Hexing (合兴村)
- Waziping (瓦子坪村)
- Datianfang (大田方村)
- Malian (码联村)
- Hualin (花林村)
- Fusifeng (罘罳峰村)
- Hongshi (红石村)
- Hongfu (鸿富村)
- Chiduan (赤塅村)

== History ==
On January 7, 2021, a group of villagers from Hualin Village, found an underground cellar below a pond and discovered 20,000 ancient coins (more than 100 kilograms) inside as they were removing sludge from the bottom of the pool during repair work. Most of ancient coins date back to the Northern Song dynasty (960–1127).

== Geography ==
The town has three reservoirs: Qiguan Reservoir (奇观水库), Meihua Reservoir (梅花水库) and Tuanshan Reservoir (团山水库).

Chu River is known as "Liushahe", a tributary of the Wei River, it flows through the town.

The Fusi Mountain is a scenic spot in the town.

== Economy ==
The mountains in the town contains a rich supply of granite.

Citrus, peach, prunus mume and tobacco are important to the economy.

== Education ==
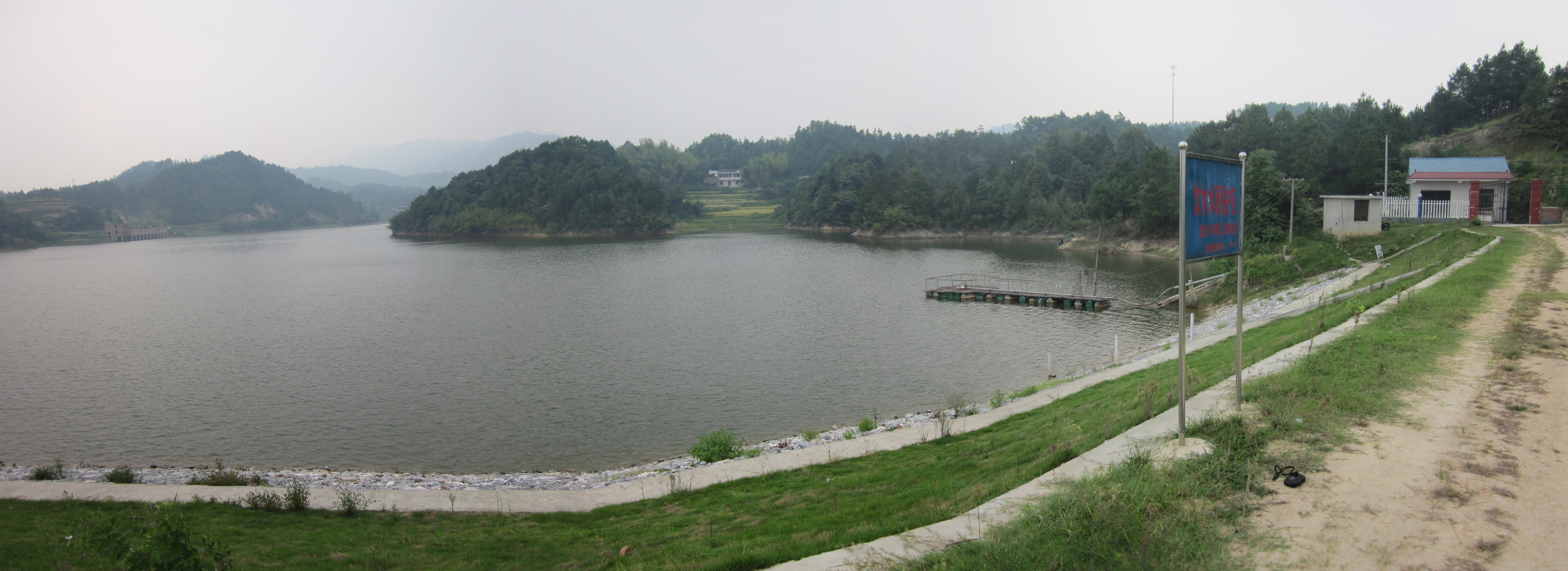
The Qiguan Reservoir.
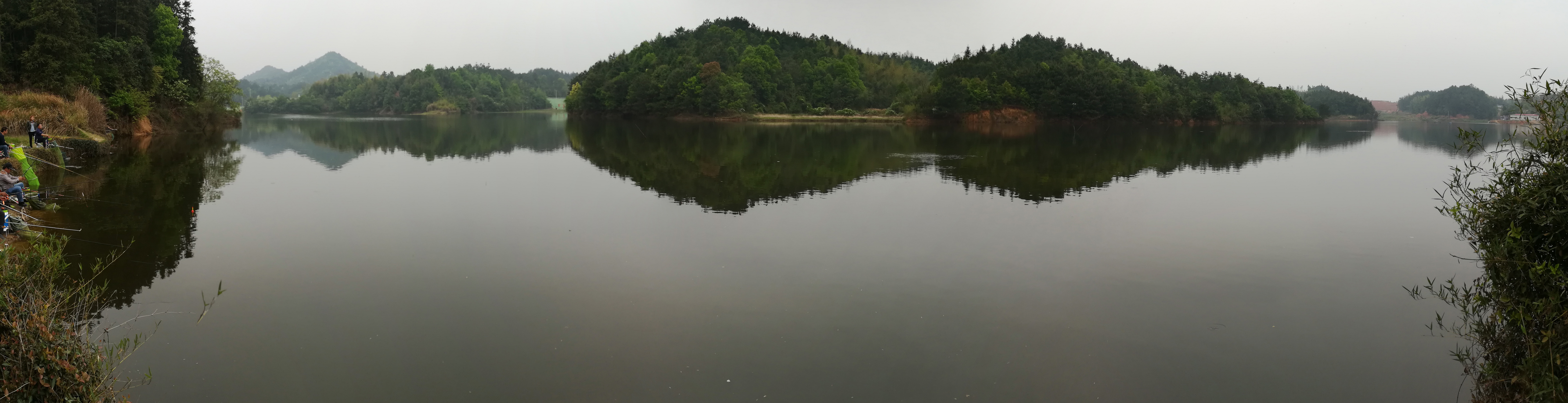
The Meihua Reservoir.

There is one senior high school located with the town limits: Ningxiang No. 7 High School (宁乡七中). Public junior high schools in the town include the Liushahe Junior High School (流沙河中学).

== Culture ==
Huaguxi is the most influential local theater.

== Transportation ==
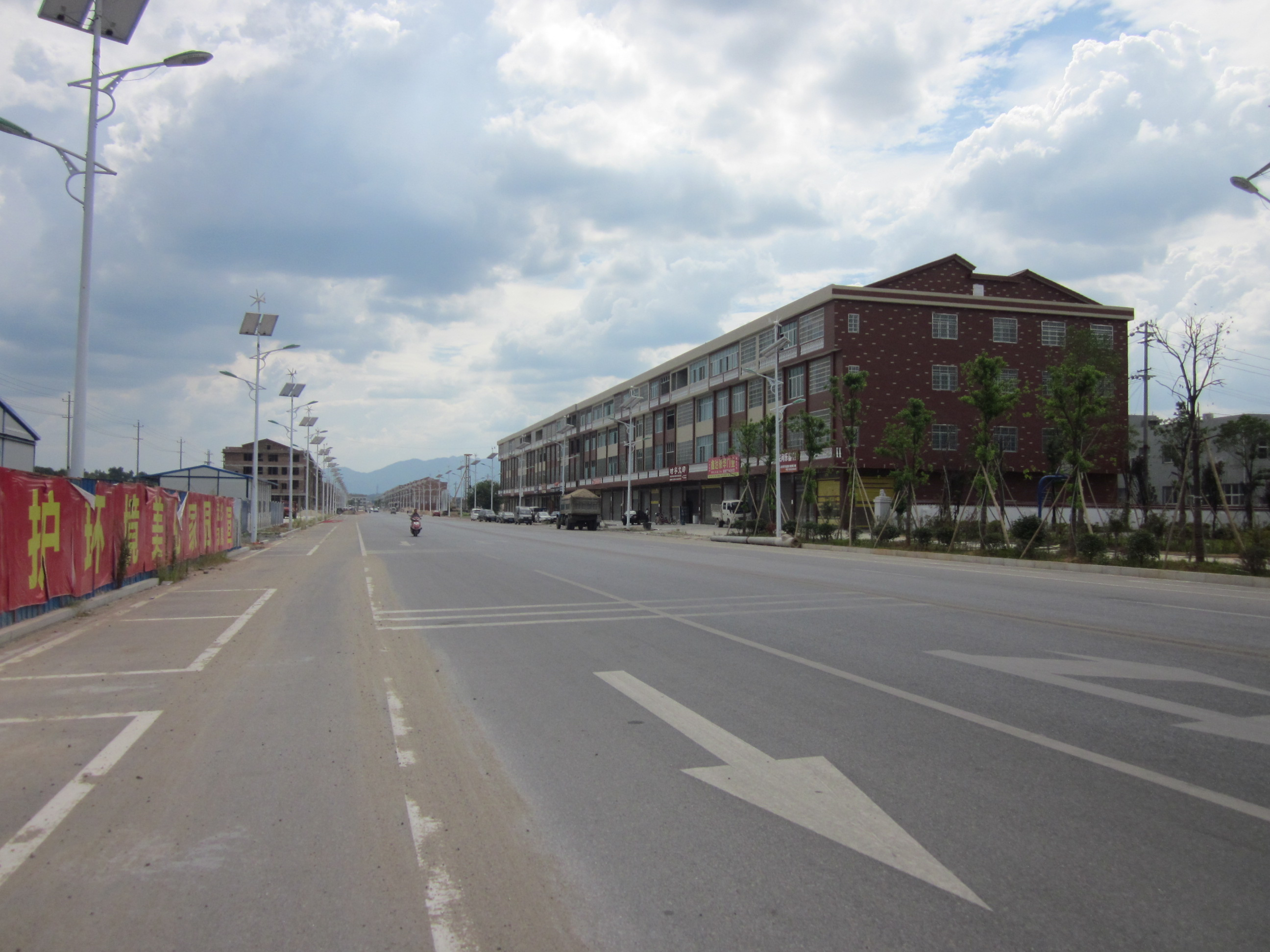
Buildings in Liushahe Town.

=== Provincial Highway ===
Major highways that connect Liushahe Town to the rest of Hunan Province include the S209, which runs south through Qingshanqiao Town to Hutian Town and north to Laoliangcang Town.

=== County Road ===
The County Road X210 runs northwest to Shatian Township.

=== Expressway ===
The Yiyang-Loudi-Hengyang Expressway in Hunan Province leads to Loudi City, Yiyang City and Hengyang City through the town.

=== Railway ===
The Luoyang–Zhanjiang Railway, from Luoyang City, Henan Province to Zhanjiang City, Guangdong Province runs through the town.

== Religion ==
Jinfeng Temple (金凤禅院) is a Buddhist temple on the top of Fusi Mountain. It was originally built in the Yuan dynasty (1271–1368) and later destroyed and rebuilt several times.

Jiandao Temple (见道庵) is also a Buddhist temple in the southwest of the town.

== Attractions ==
There are local specialties including Ningxiang Pig (宁乡猪), Castanea mollissima and kumquats.
