= Yiyang–Loudi–Hengyang Expressway =

Expressway in Hunan province, China

Yiyang-Loudi-Hengyang Expressway
- Yilouheng Expressway; Chinese: 益阳娄底衡阳高速公路
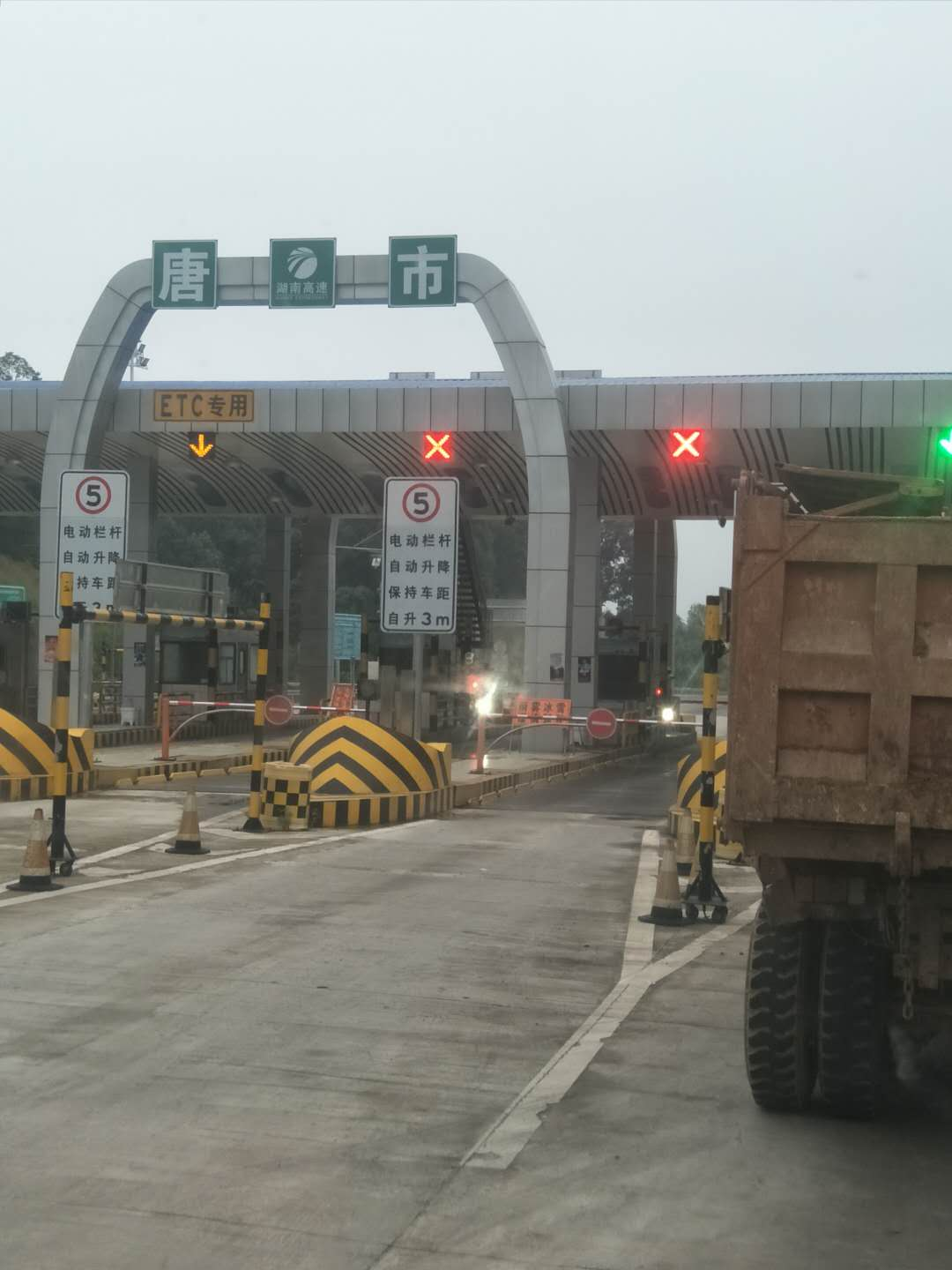
- Tangshi Toll Gate in July 2019

Route information
- Length: 222.632 km (138.337 mi)
- Existed: December 2017–present

Location
- Country: China
- Province: Hunan

Highway system
- Transport in China

Yiyang–Loudi–Hengyang Expressway
- Traditional Chinese: 益陽婁底衡陽高速公路
- Simplified Chinese: 益阳娄底衡阳高速公路
Transcriptions
Standard Mandarin
- Hanyu Pinyin: Yìyáng Lóudǐ Héngyáng Gāosù Gōnglù

Alternative Chinese name
- Traditional Chinese: 益婁衡高速公路
- Simplified Chinese: 益娄衡高速公路
Transcriptions
Standard Mandarin
- Hanyu Pinyin: Yì Lóu Héng Gāosù Gōnglù

The Yiyang-Loudi-Hengyang Expressway (Chinese: 益阳娄底衡阳高速公路; pinyin: Yìyáng Lóudǐ Héngyáng Gāosù Gōnglù) commonly abbreviated as Yilouheng Expressway (Chinese: 益娄衡高速公路), is an expressway in Hunan province, China that connects Yiyang, Loudi, and Hengyang. It is 222.632 km in length.

== Route ==
The expressway passes the following major cities:

- Shuangfeng County
- Hengyang County
- Qidong County
- Taojiang County
- Heshan District, Yiyang
- Ningxiang
- Xiangxiang
- Louxing District

== Scenic spots ==
- Goulou Mountain National Forest Park
- Mount Heng (Hunan)
- Taojiang Scenic Spot
- Xia Minghan's Former Residence
- Wang Fuzhi's Former Residence
- Luo Ronghuan's Former Residence
- Zeng Guofan's Former Residence
- Meishan Palace
- Liu Shaoqi's Former Residence
- Huitang Hot Spring
- Miyin Temple
