= Huishangang =

Huishangang Town 灰山港镇
- Town
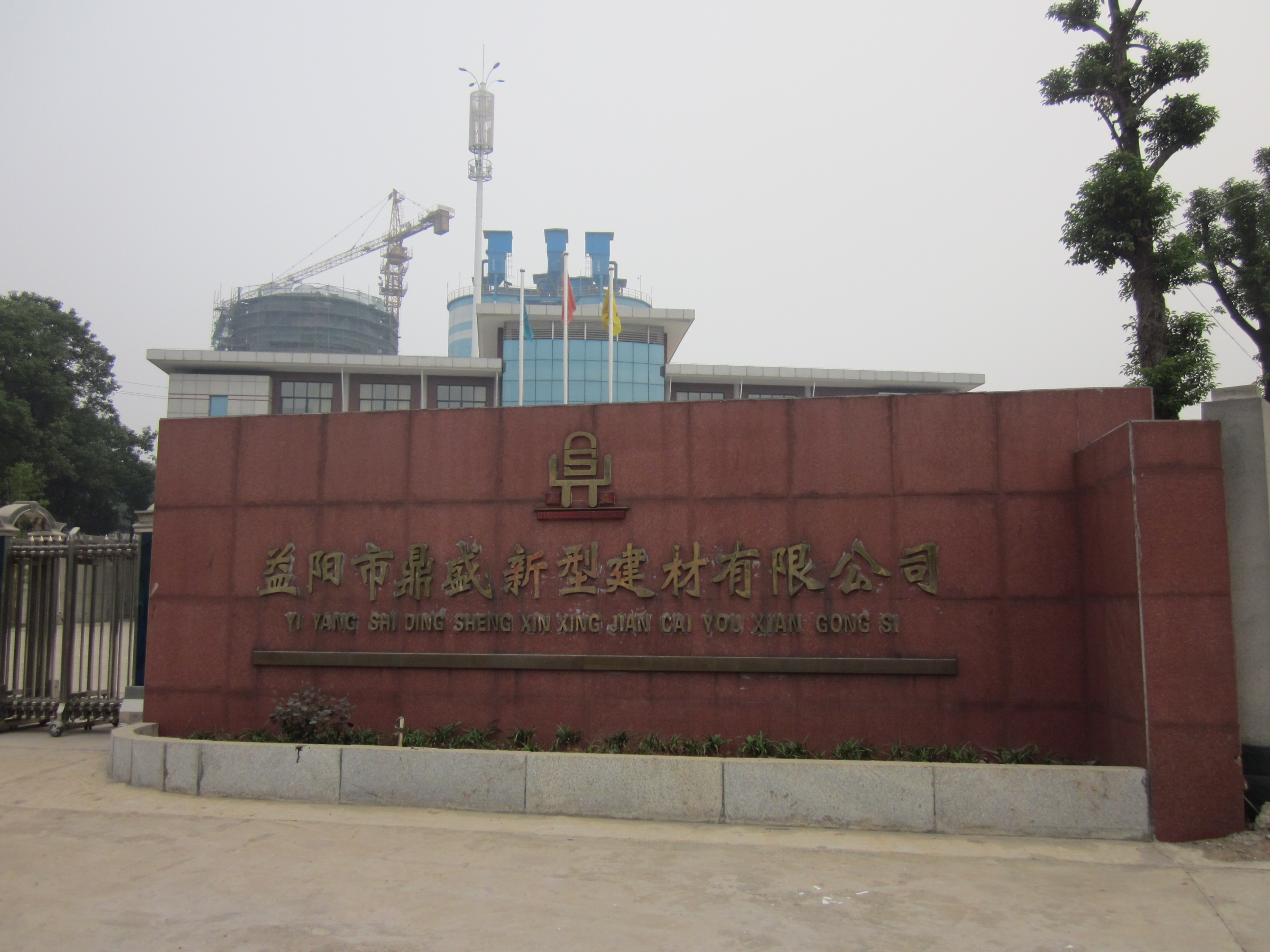

- Location in Hunan
- Coordinates: 28°17′24″N 112°14′36″E
- Country: People's Republic of China
- Province: Hunan
- Prefecture-level city: Yiyang
- County: Taojiang County

Area
  - Total: 229.7 km^{2} (88.7 sq mi)

Population
  - Total: 117,000
  - Density: 509/km^{2} (1,320/sq mi)
- Time zone: UTC+8 (China Standard)
- Area code: 0737

Huishangang Town (simplified Chinese: 灰山港镇; traditional Chinese: 灰山港鎮; pinyin: Huīshāngǎng Zhèn) is an urban town in Taojiang County, Hunan Province, People's Republic of China.

== Administrative divisions ==
The town is divided into 35 villages and 3 communities, which include the following areas: Zijinghua Community, Paomapo Community, Heyuan Community, Yangjiawan Village, Huishangang Village, Xiangyanghua Village, Tianzipo Village, Simachong Village, He'anchong Village, Zengjiawan Village, Chenjiawan Village, Wangongtang Village, Lianhechong Village, Wangjiachong Village, Xuefengshan Village, Xiaochong Village, Jinshazhou Village, Zhoujiatan Village, Chengquanwan Village, Mayuan'ao Village, Dachong Village, Yuanjiaqiao Village, Liujiawan Village, Tanshujie Village, Ruanqiao Village, Xiaojiaduan Village, Qishi Village, Lizishan Village, Keshangchong Village, Lvjiawan Village, Tiekuang'ao Village, Maoliping Village, Hexishui Village, Jinshaping Village, Daqiaotang Village, Tankoushang Village, Dujiawan Village, and Ganquanshan Village (紫荆花社区、跑马坡社区、河源社区、杨家湾村、灰山港村、向阳花村、天子坡村、司马冲村、和安冲村、曾家湾村、陈家湾村、万功塘村、连河冲村、汪家冲村、雪峰山村、小冲村、金沙洲村、周家潭村、澄泉湾村、麻园坳村、大冲村、源嘉桥村、刘家湾村、檀树界村、软桥村、肖家塅村、企石村、栗子山村、克上冲村、绿稼湾村、铁矿坳村、毛栗坪村、河溪水村、金沙坪村、大桥塘村、滩口上村、杜家湾村、甘泉山村).
