= Ganggang Hu Guidice =

Chinese-American author and artist

- 胡剛剛
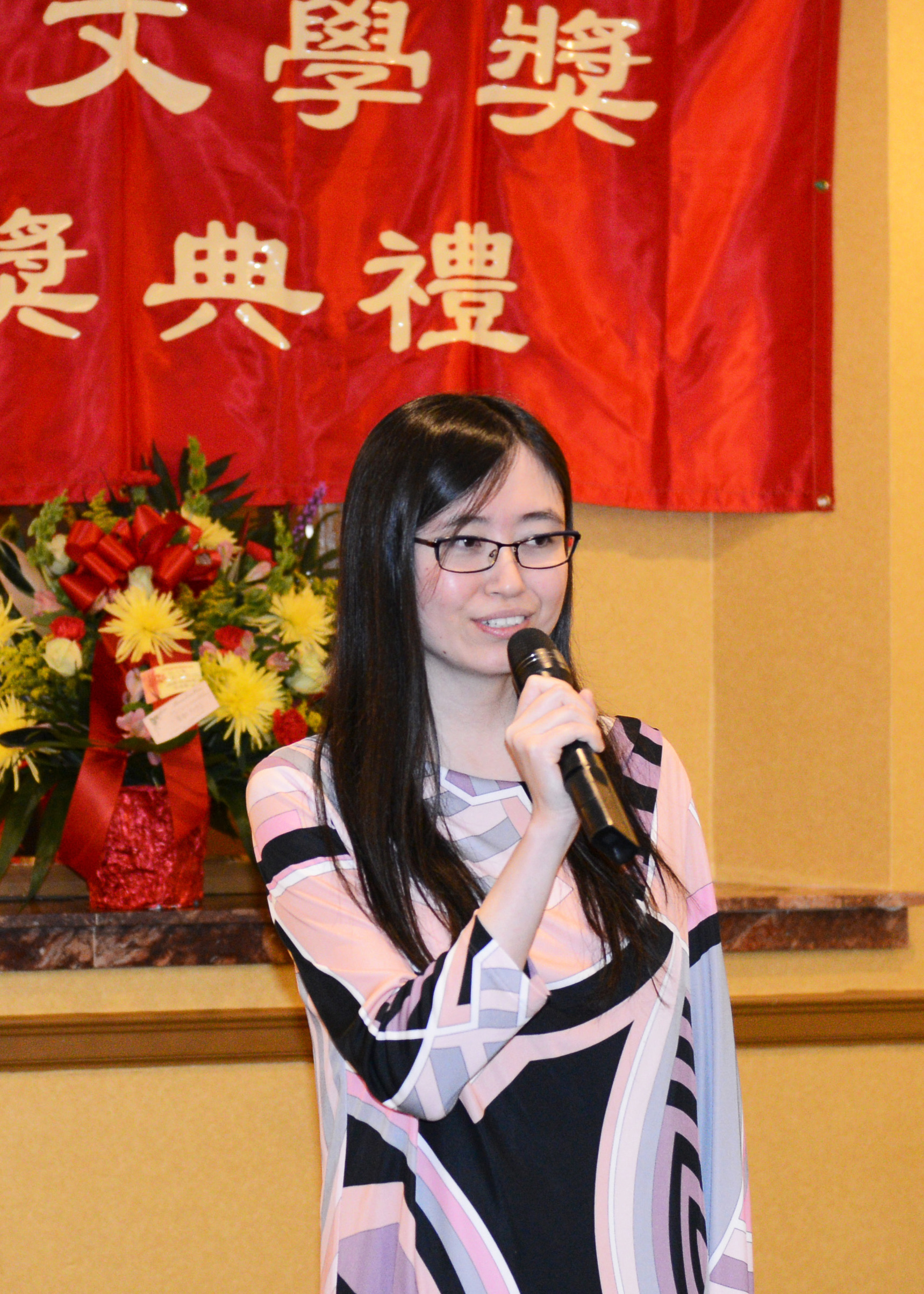
- Guidice giving Sino Literature Award acceptance speech, 2015
- Born: March 23, 1984 (age 42); Beijing, China
- Occupations: Writer; Artist
- Writing career
- Language: Chinese, English
- Years active: 2002-2004, 2014–present
- Genres: Nonfiction, Poetry, Short story
- Notable works: Boundary (Nonfiction), Control (Short story), Journey with You (Poetry), Gangzhu's Quotes(Comic series)
- Notable awards: Castello di Duino XI Edition; Sino Literature Award; Youth Literary Awards; Liang Shih-chiu Literary Award

Chinese name
- Traditional Chinese: 胡剛剛
- Simplified Chinese: 胡刚刚
Transcriptions
Standard Mandarin
- Hanyu Pinyin: Hú Gānggāng
- Website: www.gangganghu.com

Ganggang Hu Guidice (Chinese: 胡剛剛; pinyin: Hú Gānggāng, born March 23, 1984) is a Chinese author and artist living in Georgia, United States.

== Biography ==
Guidice was born in Beijing, China. Her grandfather, Guogang Hu, was a dance theorist and choreographer, and her second great-grandfather, Anquan Hu, was a scholar at Hanlin Academy and the Guangxu Emperor's advisor. She graduated from the High School Affiliated to Beijing Normal University in 2002, and then studied at University of Science and Technology Beijing. She moved to Georgia, United States after receiving a Master's degree in Computer Science from the University of Pennsylvania. She works as an IT professional and columnist.

Guidice published music reviews and lyrics translation in Hit Music magazine during her time at university, and completed a science fiction story, Control, then stopped writing for ten years. After resuming writing in 2014, she won the Castello di Duino International poetry competition XI Edition, Youth Literary Awards for two consecutive years, and Sino Literature Award for three consecutive years, and was subsequently featured in the Sino Monthly New Jersey Magazine. Her nonfiction, poetry and short stories have been published in World Journal, The China Press, International Daily News and United Daily News. In 2019, Guidice's nonfiction collection, Fragments of Growing Up, won the Liang Shih-chiu Literary Award in Taiwan.

In 2010 and 2011, Guidice was invited to the first and second International Festival of North Alabama. In 2019, her artwork "Waiting" was selected to be a finalist in the International Artist Grand Prize Competition, and was exhibited at Art Revolution Taipei. Her comic series Gangzhu's Quotes debuted in 2021.

== Original works ==
=== Collections ===
- Hu, Ganggang (September 1, 2021). Boundary. Beijing Times Chinese Press. ISBN 978-7569942088.
- Hu, Ganggang (February 1, 2022). Gangzhu's Quotes. Heilongjiang Fine Arts Publishing House. ISBN 978-7559380678.
- Hu, Ganggang (September 1, 2022). Gangzhu's Quotes 2. Heilongjiang Fine Arts Publishing House. ISBN 978-7559387004.
- Hu, Ganggang (October 1, 2023). Treasure. Taibai Literature and Art Publishing House. ISBN 978-7551324267.
- Hu, Ganggang (May 1, 2025). Anti-Entropy. Baihua Literature and Art Publishing House. ISBN 978-7530689578.
- Guidice, Ganggang (Sep 1, 2025). Marco's World. Relevant Publishers LLC. ISBN 978-1953263438.

=== Nonfiction ===
- "Trace of the Snow", World Journal, 2016
- "Dissection of the Minor", World Journal, 2018
- "Mimicry", The China Press, 2019
- "Simulate Silence", World Journal, 2019
- "Children's Games"(online), Hong Kong Literary, 2019
- "Miniature Wars", World Journal, 2019
- "Boundary", Luming, 2019
- "Time Difference", World Journal, 2019
- "Escape", International Daily News, 2019
- "Yaw"(online), United Daily News, 2020
- "Purple"(online), United Daily News, 2020
- "Profile"(online), Hong Kong Literary, 2020
- "One Day"(online), United Daily News, 2020
- "To You - Quantum Entanglement"("Micro confession", part 1), World Journal, 2020
- "To You - Conjugation"("Micro confession", part 3), International Daily News, 2020
- "Duck Sinking", World Journal, 2021
- "Only You Know", World Journal, 2021
- "Balance"(online), Hong Kong Literary, 2021
- "Don't Let You Know", World Journal, 2022
- "Sleeping Peacefully When Paintbrushes Pause"(online), United Daily News, 2022
- "Wish You Knew"(online), United Daily News, 2022
- "If You Knew, International Daily News, 2022
- "The Words When I Was Sick", World Journal, 2022
- "This Is Used to Be My Playground", World Journal, 2022
- "The Fish and the Bear's Paw", United Daily News, 2022
- "Unstable", Ra Poetry, 2023 Aug
- "The Cure of a Koala", World Journal, 2023
- "Idiom Obsession", People's Daily Overseas Edition, 2023
- "Fragment", United Daily News, 2024
- "Up the Tree", United Daily News, 2024
- "The World Know You Were Here", China Daily News, 2024
- "Be with Myself", United Daily News, 2024
- "Serendipity Boudoir Photography", China Daily News, 2024
- "Beauty Comes from Self-Reflection", China Daily News, 2024
- "Appreciating the Beauty in Details", World Journal, 2024
- "The Misty Waves Honor the Splendid Years", China Daily News, 2025
- "A Sea Unrelated to Love", China Daily News, 2025
- "Gradient", World Journal, 2025
- "Lost in the Fragrant Woods", World Journal, 2025
- "To Gemini K", China Daily News, 2025
- "Now that AI is here, what's next for literary creators?", World Journal, 2025
- "Is writing worth it?", World Journal, 2025
- "Express your Obsession", World Journal, 2025

=== Short stories ===
- "Inertia", World Journal, 2020
- "Hermit", World Journal, 2020
- "Disorder", World Journal, 2020
- "Not About Cheating", World Journal, 2021
- "Searching", World Journal, 2021
- "Ignorance", World Journal, 2022
- "Even Though You Like Me", World Journal, 2022
- "The Trilogy of a Discontinued Journal", World Journal, 2023
- "Write, write! Write?", World Journal, 2023
- "The Long-Lasting Family War", World Journal, 2023
- "Fake Friendship", World Journal, 2024
- "When Ambitious Youth Talk About Marriage", World Journal, 2024
- "Your Voice Sounds Familiar", World Journal, 2024
- "Placebo Blind Box", World Journal, 2025

=== Other collected works ===
- "Control", Fantasy Engineer, other authors including Hao Jingfang, Shanghai Scientific and Technical Publishers, 2017
- "Journey with you", DOPO IL VIAGGIO Poesie/After the Journey Poems, Ibiskos Editrice Risolo, 2015
- "Dream, cherish every second you have", Modern Chinese Prose Selection, Writers Publishing House, 2018
- "Mask", Upon Arrival: Compass, Eber & Wein Publishing, 2019
- "Impression", Clouds of my Hometown, other authors including Zhang Ling, Zhejiang People's Publishing House, 2019
- "Y", Modern Chinese Poetry Selection, Writers Publishing House, 2019
- "Time Difference", Annual Anthology of Works by Chinese Writers in North America (2019), Long Publishing Corp., 2020
- "Love is Gone", Best Overseas Chinese Poetry, Chicago Academic Press, 2021

== Awards ==
- 2014 Castello Di Duino International Poetry Competition, Poem Selected To Be Published, "Journey with you"
- 2014 Youth Literary Awards, Honorable Mention, Poetry Category, "Journey with you"
- 2014 Huadi Literature Award, 3rd Prize, Poetry Category, "Faces in my Dreams"
- 2014 Sino Literature Award, Honorable Mention, Poetry Category, "Specimen"
- 2015 Youth Literary Awards, 2nd Place, Nonfiction Category, "Examples of Cognitive Development"
- 2015 Sino Literature Award, 1st Place, Short Story Category, "Control"
- 2015 Sino Literature Award, 2nd Place, Poetry Category, "Water·Life"
- 2015 Sino Literature Award, 3rd Place, Nonfiction Category, "Secret Code"
- 2016 Sino Literature Award, 3rd Place, Poetry Category, "The 7th Death Anniversary"
- 2016 Sino Literature Award, Honorable Mention, Nonfiction Category, "Fragments of Growing Up"
- 2016 Taichung Literature Award, Honorable Mention, Short Story Category, "Vivi and I"
- 2018 Dang Xia Yue Kan National Writing Competition, Finalist, Nonfiction Category, "Funeral of Cherry Blossom"
- 2019 Sino Literature Award, 3rd Place, Nonfiction Category, "Monochrome"
- 2019 Liang Shih-chiu Literary Award, Top prize, Nonfiction Category, "Fragments of Growing Up"
- 2020 Sino Literature Award, Honorable Mention, Nonfiction Category, "To You - Many-worlds Interpretation"("Micro confession", part 2)
- 2020 PSI Literature Award, 3rd Place, "Funeral of Cherry Blossom"
- 2022 Overseas Chinese Literary Work Award, Honorable Mention, Nonfiction Category, "Boundary"
- 2022 Sanmao Prose Prize, Finalist, Prose Collection, "Boundary"
- 2023 The Homeland Tribute: World Chinese Literature Award, Nonfiction Category, "Idiom Obsession"
- 2024 Liu Chengzhang Prose Award, Dark Horse Award, Prose Collection, "Treasure"
- 2024 Overseas Chinese Literary Work Award, Honorable Mention, Nonfiction Category, "Treasure"
- 2024 Sanmao Prose Prize, Finalist, Prose Collection, "Treasure"
- 2025 Dongli Cup Sun Li Prose Award, Honorable Mention, Prose Collection, "Boundary"
- 2025 Overseas Chinese Literary Work Award, Honorable Mention, Nonfiction Category, "Anti-Entropy"
