= SSTP =

SSTP may refer to:

== Technology ==
- Screened shielded twisted pair, a type of wiring
- Secure Socket Tunneling Protocol, a form of virtual private network (VPN) tunnel
- Simple Symmetric Transport Protocol, a protocol for delivering messages between clients and servers
- Simple Studio Profile (SStP), of the MPEG-4 Part 2 video compression format

== Other uses ==
- Shanghai Scientific and Technical Publishers
- Socialist Workers' Party of Finland (Suomen Sosialistinen Työväenpuolue)
- Finnish-Socialist Workers' Party (Suomalaissosialistinen Työväen Puolue)
- Streamlined Sales Tax Project
