= China Pacific Insurance Company =

Chinese insurance company

China Pacific Insurance (Group)
- Trade name: China Pacific Insurance; China Pacific Insurance Company; CPIC
- Native name: 中国太平洋保险(集团)股份有限公司
- Formerly: China Pacific Insurance Corporation
- Company type: Public
- Traded as: SSE: 601601 (A share); SEHK: 2601 (H share); LSE: CPIC
- Industry: Financial services
- Founded: 1991; 35 years ago
- Headquarters: Shanghai, China
- Area served: China
Key people
Kong Qingwei	(chairman & executive director)
Huo Lianhong	(executive director)
Zhang Yuhua	(deputy president)
- Services: Life and non-life insurance
- Revenue: ▲CN¥247.0 billion (2015)
- Operating income: ▲CN¥24.3 billion (2015)
- Net income: ▲CN¥17.8 billion (2015)
- Total assets: ▲CN¥923.8 billion (2015)
- Total equity: ▲CN¥133.3 billion (2015)
Owner
Central Government of China	(23.05%)
Shanghai Government	(21.33%)
China Securities Finance	(2.36%)
- Website: cpic.com.cn
- Footnotes / references in a consolidated basis

China Pacific Insurance (Group) Co., Ltd.
- Simplified Chinese: 中国太平洋保险(集团)股份有限公司
- Traditional Chinese: 中國太平洋保險(集團)股份有限公司
Transcriptions
Standard Mandarin
- Hanyu Pinyin: Zhōngguó tàipíngyáng bǎoxiǎn (jítuán) gǔfèn yǒuxiàn gōngsī

Pacific Insurance
- Simplified Chinese: 太平洋保险
- Traditional Chinese: 太平洋保險
Transcriptions
Standard Mandarin
- Hanyu Pinyin: tàipíngyáng bǎoxiǎn

Second alternative Chinese name
- Simplified Chinese: 中国太保
- Traditional Chinese: 中国太保
Transcriptions
Standard Mandarin
- Hanyu Pinyin: tàibǎo

China Pacific Insurance (Group) Co., Ltd. (CPIC) known as Pacific Insurance, is a Chinese insurance company. It was established on the basis of the former China Pacific Insurance Corporation, which was founded in 1991 approved by the People's Bank of China. Its headquarters is in Shanghai.

CPIC Group is the second largest property insurance company (after People's Insurance Company of China) and the third largest life insurance company (after China Life Insurance and Ping An Insurance) in Mainland China. It provides integrated insurance services, including life insurance, property insurance and reinsurance, through its subsidiaries.

The company offers life and property insurance products and services through its subsidiaries, China Pacific Life Insurance Co., Ltd and China Pacific Property Insurance Co., Ltd., respectively. Through its subsidiary China Pacific Asset Management Co., Ltd, the company is also involved in the management, provision of consulting services relating to asset management and operation of insurance assets. The company's property insurance products include car insurance, insurance of family's properties, liability insurance, investment type insurance and accident insurance/injury insurance, while its life insurance products include endowment insurance, health insurance, juvenile assurance, insurance cover services and petty insurance.

== Listings ==
Its A shares were listed on the Shanghai Stock Exchange on December 25, 2007, with IPO price 30 yuan per share. At the first trading day, its share price closed at 48.17 yuan, 61% more than its IPO price. It is planning to issue H shares in the Hong Kong Stock Exchange in near future. CPIC dropped below the IPO price of RMB¥30 on 26 March 2008 and closed at RMB¥27.98.

Its H shares were listed on the Hong Kong Stock Exchange on 23 December 2009 with IPO price of HK$28 per share.

== Shareholders ==
As of 31 December 2015:

- Central People's Government of China (State Council)
  - State-owned Assets Supervision and Administration Commission (SASAC) of the State Council
    - Baosteel Group (14.93%)
  - The Ministry of Finance of the People's Republic of China (via China Tobacco)
    - via Shanghai Tobacco Group (5.17%)
    - via Hongta Group (1.73%)
  - China Securities Finance Co., Ltd. (2.36%)
  - Central Huijin Investment (1.22%)
- SASAC of the Shanghai Municipal Government (21.33%)
  - Shenergy Group (13.52%)
  - Shanghai State-owned Assets Operation Co., Ltd. (5.04%)
  - Shanghai Jiushi (Group) Co., Ltd. (2.77%)
- general public (53.26%)
