= Meitan County =

Meitan County 湄潭县
- County
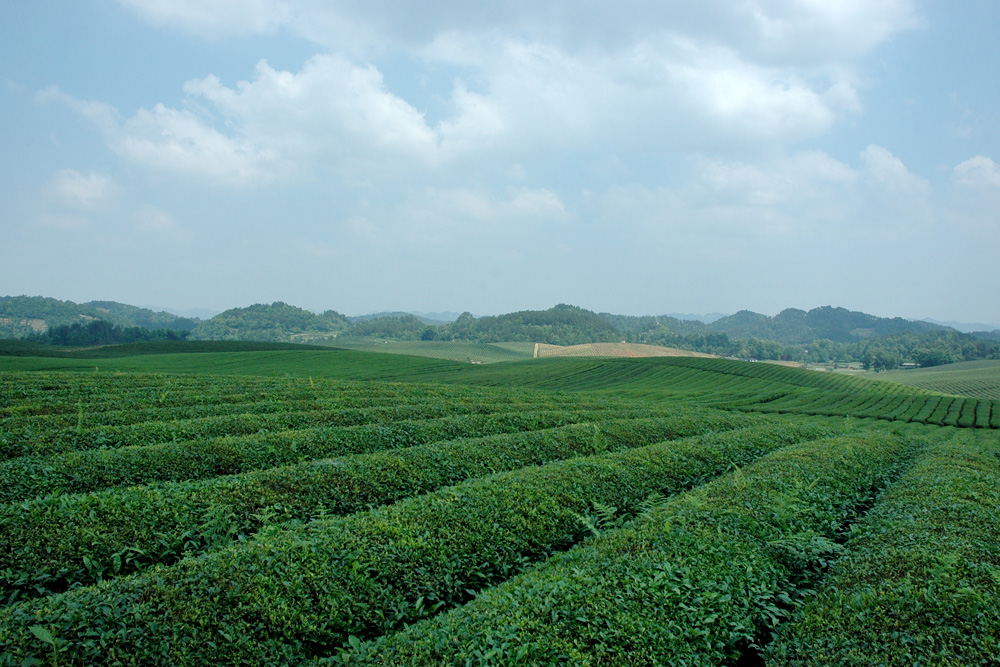

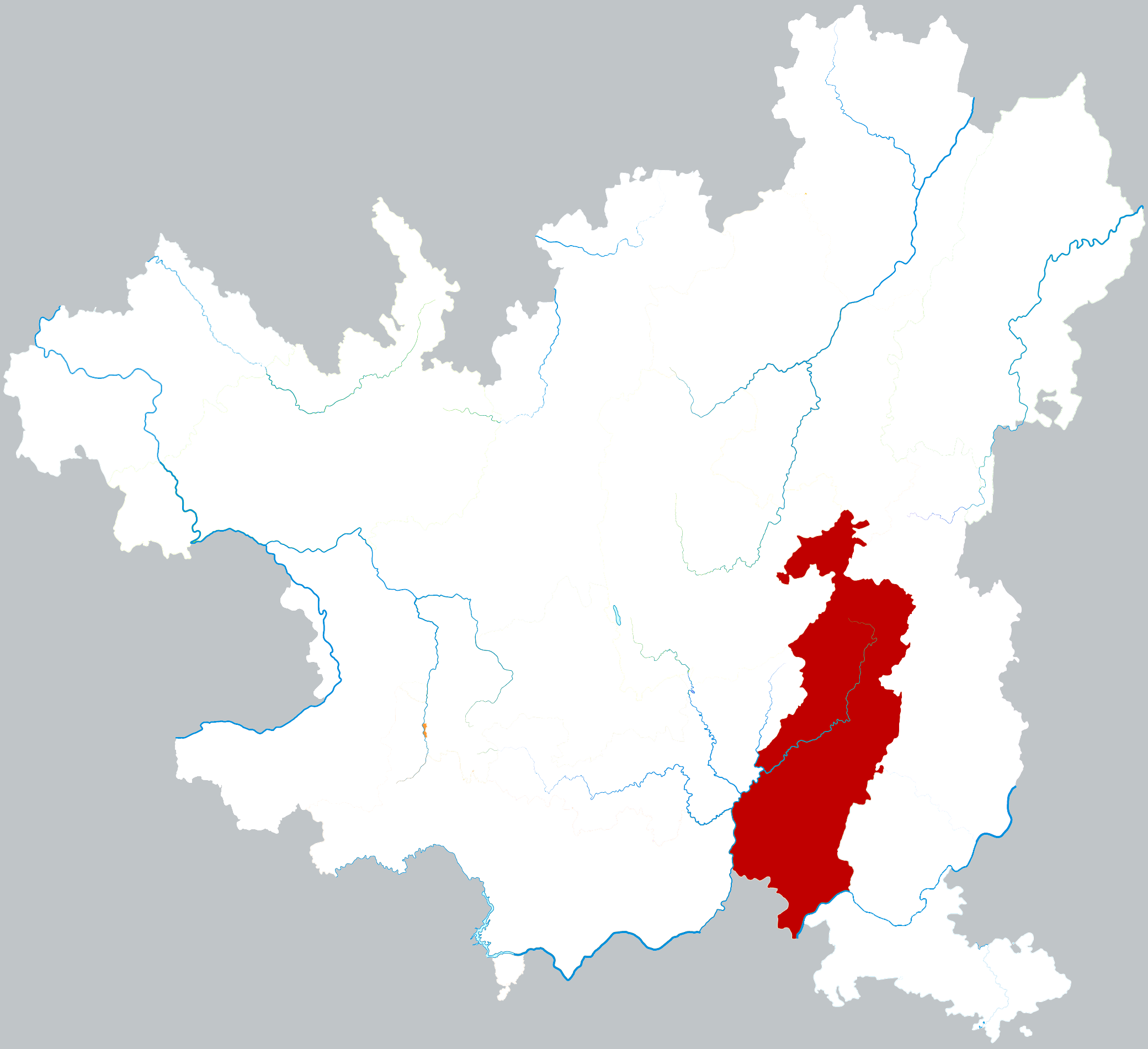

- Location of the seat in Guizhou Meitan (Southwest China)
- Coordinates (Meitan County government): 27°44′56″N 107°27′55″E
- Country: China
- Province: Guizhou
- Prefecture-level city: Zunyi
- County seat: Meijiang

Area
  - Total: 1,864 km^{2} (720 sq mi)

Population (2010)
  - Total: 377,354
  - Density: 202.4/km^{2} (524.3/sq mi)
- Time zone: UTC+8 (China Standard)
- Postal code: 564100

Meitan (Chinese: 湄潭; pinyin: Méitán) is a county of Guizhou province, China. It is under the administration of the prefecture-level city of Zunyi.

Meitan, located in the northern part of Guizhou Province, has a total area of 1,864 km^{2} (720 sq mi). Meitan has a population of 480,000, 420,000 of which work in agriculture. It consists of 9 towns, 6 townships, 118 villages, and 14 communities. The average altitude of Meitan is 972.7 m (3,191 ft). The forest coverage rate is 56.5%. Meitan is in the humid subtropical climate zone. The average temperature is 15.21 °C (59.4 °F). Meitan has four distinct seasons, abundant rainfall, mild climate, 284 frost-free days each year, and an average annual rainfall of 1,112 mm (43.8 in).

The County of Meitan was established in 1601 (in Ming Dynasty). It was a base for the Chinese Red Army during the Long March. Zhejiang University (浙江大学) held classes in Meitan for seven years during the Second Sino-Japanese War. Meitan has been producing tea since 1939 and is known nationally for its tea.

Meitan is rich in agricultural resources and is a typical inland agricultural county. It is famous for its high-quality tea, rice, tobacco, rapeseed, corn, wheat, sericulture, and Chinese herbal medicine. Meitan is known as "The County of Tobacco", "Home of Chinese Liquor", "Tea City", and "The Granary".

Meitan is the largest tea-producing county in Guizhou. Meitan has 20.5 mu (1367 sq kilometers) of tea fields with an annual output of 400 million yuan. Guizhou Meitan Southwest Tea City is the tea market appointed by the Ministry of Agriculture located in the south part of the county. It is the largest Tea distributing center in Northern Guizhou. Meitan's "Mao Gong" high-quality rice, known as "China's first rice", was awarded the gold medal in the National Quality Rice Exposition for five consecutive years from 2003 to 2007. Meitan produces 80,000 quintal high-quality tobacco annually and is the major producer for the Shanghai Tobacco Group, which produces "Chunghwa" and "Panda" cigarettes. Mae Wine received the only gold medal ever reward to white liquor in Leipzig International Fair in 1988.

Meitan is also famous for its beautiful landscapes and natural scenery. There are provincial scenic areas "Mejiang Landscape Gallery", the country's largest contiguous tea fields "Western China Tea Sea," "The world's Largest Tea Pot" recorded in Guinness Book of World Records, the national agricultural tourism demonstration sites "Hetao Ba - Dragon & phoenix Tea Garden", the various karst topography "Hundred-Faced Water" and much more.

== Administrative divisions ==
Meitan County is divided into 3 subdistricts and 12 towns:

subdistricts

- Meijiang 湄江街道
- Huangjiaba 黄家坝街道
- Yuquan 鱼泉街道

towns

- Yongxing 永兴镇
- Fuxing 复兴镇
- Mashan 马山镇
- Gaotai 高台镇
- Maoping 茅坪镇
- Xinglong 兴隆镇
- Xinnan 新南镇
- Shilian 石莲镇
- Chaole 抄乐镇
- Xima 洗马镇
- Xihe 西河镇
- Tiancheng 天城镇

== Climate ==
Climate data for Meitan, elevation 808 m (2,651 ft), (1991–2020 normals, extremes 1981–present)
Month	Jan	Feb	Mar	Apr	May	Jun	Jul	Aug	Sep	Oct	Nov	Dec	Year
Record high °C (°F)	24.4 (75.9)	32.0 (89.6)	34.3 (93.7)	34.6 (94.3)	36.2 (97.2)	34.6 (94.3)	36.7 (98.1)	37.1 (98.8)	36.6 (97.9)	33.2 (91.8)	28.0 (82.4)	22.4 (72.3)	37.1 (98.8)
Mean daily maximum °C (°F)	7.3 (45.1)	10.2 (50.4)	15.0 (59.0)	20.8 (69.4)	24.6 (76.3)	27.0 (80.6)	30.1 (86.2)	30.4 (86.7)	26.3 (79.3)	20.1 (68.2)	15.3 (59.5)	9.5 (49.1)	19.7 (67.5)
Daily mean °C (°F)	4.4 (39.9)	6.7 (44.1)	10.7 (51.3)	15.9 (60.6)	19.7 (67.5)	22.7 (72.9)	25.3 (77.5)	24.9 (76.8)	21.4 (70.5)	16.2 (61.2)	11.5 (52.7)	6.3 (43.3)	15.5 (59.9)
Mean daily minimum °C (°F)	2.4 (36.3)	4.3 (39.7)	7.8 (46.0)	12.5 (54.5)	16.3 (61.3)	19.7 (67.5)	21.7 (71.1)	21.1 (70.0)	18.0 (64.4)	13.6 (56.5)	8.9 (48.0)	4.1 (39.4)	12.5 (54.6)
Record low °C (°F)	−5.1 (22.8)	−4.6 (23.7)	−3.2 (26.2)	1.8 (35.2)	7.4 (45.3)	12.9 (55.2)	14.6 (58.3)	14.5 (58.1)	9.5 (49.1)	4.6 (40.3)	−1.8 (28.8)	−4.1 (24.6)	−5.1 (22.8)
Average precipitation mm (inches)	25.1 (0.99)	25.0 (0.98)	45.2 (1.78)	88.3 (3.48)	154.5 (6.08)	227.1 (8.94)	178.2 (7.02)	111.9 (4.41)	84.9 (3.34)	106.1 (4.18)	46.1 (1.81)	23.3 (0.92)	1,115.7 (43.93)
Average precipitation days (≥ 0.1 mm)	14.6	13.4	16.3	16.5	17.7	17.3	13.3	12.3	11.6	15.9	12.4	12.4	173.7
Average snowy days	4.4	2.0	0.6	0	0	0	0	0	0	0	0	1.8	8.8
Average relative humidity (%)	81	80	80	79	80	82	79	77	79	83	82	80	80
Mean monthly sunshine hours	27.8	37.0	60.1	83.0	98.7	91.5	161.9	182.1	121.2	69.0	61.1	40.7	1,034.1
Percentage possible sunshine	8	12	16	21	24	22	38	45	33	20	19	13	23
Source: China Meteorological Administration
