= China Daily News =

China Daily News can refer to:

- Chinese Hand Laundry Alliance#China Daily News and the Red Scare, a newspaper founded in 1940 by the Chinese Hand Laundry Alliance
- China Daily News (Taiwan), a contemporary newspaper published in Taiwan, Republic of China

== See also ==
- China Daily, an English-language daily newspaper published in the People's Republic of China
- Chinese Daily News (disambiguation)
