= Michael Sedge =

American novelist

- Born: Flint, Michigan, U.S.
- Education: University of La Verne (BA)
- Occupations: Novelist; Journalist
- Spouse: Gabriella Giugliano
- Children: Amanda and Daniele
- Writing career
- Language: English
- Genre: Non-fiction
- Notable works: The Lost Ships of Pisa; The Oracle
- Notable awards: President of the Italian Republic's Book of the Year Award; Paris Book Festival Best Fiction Award
- Website: www.thesedgegroup.com

Michael H. Sedge is an American journalist, author, marketing specialist, lecturer, film-TV producer and entrepreneur. He founded the marketing company Strawberry Media, the publishing firm The Sedge Group, and co-founded the U.S. small business, Michael-Bruno, LLC, which offers architectural design, engineering services, and construction management to the U.S. government in Europe, Africa, and the Middle East. His latest non-fiction work The Lost Ships of Pisa won the President of the Italian Republic's Book of the Year Award for a Foreign Author.

== Early life ==
Sedge was born in Flint, Michigan, and graduated with a Bachelor of Arts from University of La Verne in La Verne, California. In 1973 Sedge started his service in the United States Navy, and was soon assigned to Southern Italy for what was meant to be a 48-month stay. He was assigned to diverse locales in Europe until 1977. Eventually Sedge, who also speaks Italian, took up permanent residence in Naples, Italy to pursue writing and journalism.

=== Marketing career ===
In 1988, Sedge founded Strawberry Media Agency, a Naples-based media/marketing agency. In 1989, MCI Communications hired Sedge to establish and direct their global military marketing. He did so until 1995, and in his last four years running the project, the company's international calling card revenues from the military market increased by $3 million annually.

After 1995, Arrowhead Global Solutions contracted Sedge to manage the logistical, operational, and financial activities of the Army and Air Force Exchange Service (AAFES) contract for AT&T Call Home services in the then war-ridden country of Bosnia and Herzegovina. After one year, he was assigned as in-country project manager for Arrowhead Global Solutions’ contract with the Defense Information Systems Agency (DISA) for the design and construction of satellite communications systems in Italy. Other clients under Sedge and his Strawberry Media agency included Bank of America, Holiday Inn International, Mobil Oil, Rapid Link Telecommunications, Deep Bridge, and Planet Euro. He was VP of Marketing for the Israeli-based Megagiga, the 7th largest hosting agency in the world. Sedge's firm also produced editorial packages (articles, photos, illustrations) for more than forty publications around the world and syndicated in Europe, North America, Asia, and the Middle East. Strawberry Media also had a photography division specializing in stock databases, many of which were images taken by Sedge himself.

In 2003 he co-founded Michael-Bruno, LLC, an American architectural design, engineering service and construction management firm. The company is headquartered in Wilmington, Delaware, with operational offices in Europe, Africa, and the Middle East. Michael-Bruno, LLC has won multiple contracts with NATO, the U.S. military, as well as Italian restorative projects.

The Sedge Group

In an Entrepreneur profile, Sedge was dubbed the "wizard of marketing." The publishing guru Sol Stein sought Sedge when looking to market his own books in Europe. Sedge is also owner of The Sedge Group, a publishing/marketing firm based in Wilmington, Delaware. The Sedge Group acts as a publishing/media firm to get companies exposure in high-tech/finance media.

== Publishing history ==
Worldwide, Sedge is credited in more than 4,000 articles, several audio tape scripts, children's plays, some 30 books, and four television documentaries. His topics often cover expatriate affairs, United States and NATO military, archaeology, the London theater beat, the business of freelance writing, and Italy. In June 1998, Sedge was hired as the special assignment writer for the Alexandria, Egypt production of the Discovery Channel's Cleopatra's Palace. The project entailed a book and a documentary about the rediscovery of her palace on the island of Antirhodos. In 2003, Sedge was a contributing editor to the "Armed Forces Journal International," publishing such features as "Not-So-Friendly Fire War in Iraq Shows Fratricide Remains an Enduring Problem". It was a report on casualties of friendly fire during the U.S. led war in Iraq, including causes of friendly fire incidents and technical solutions to the problem.

=== Publications ===
As foreign correspondent

- The Associated Press (military correspondent for Mediterranean, Middle East, Northern Africa)
- Newsweek (military correspondent)
- Armed Forces Journal International
- Scientific American - Discovering Archaeology (Mediterranean/Middle East editor)
- Family Magazine (travel editor)
- R&R Magazine (travel writer)
- International Living
- Internetnews.com
- Diplomat (UK)
- Off Duty Publications (Mediterranean editor)
- Cardiology World News
- International Travel World

Other contributions

- Los Angeles Times
- New York Times
- Robb Report
- International Daily News
- Club International
- Earthwatch
- Time-Life
- Writer's Digest
- Newsweek International
- Compass (regular contributor to Mobil Oil's corporate magazine)

=== Books ===
- Commercialization of the Oceans (1987)
- Adventure Guide to Italy (1988/Revised 2013)
- Selling Books to the Military Market
- Double Your Income through Foreign Sales
- The Writer's and Photographer's Guide to Global Markets (1998)
- Marketing Strategies for Writers (1999)
- Successful Syndication: A Guide for Writers and Cartoonists (Allworth Press, 2000)
- The Mediterranean Diet, Origins and Myths (2000)
- The Photojournalist's Guide to Making Money (2000)
- Successful Syndication (2000)
- The Lost Ships of Pisa (Italian Edition: Il Porto Sepolto di Pisa) (2002-2003)
- The Best Hikes in Italy: A Insider’s Guide (2013)
- The Oracle (Italian Edition: L’Oracolo) (2014)
- Death Watch (Italian Edition: Sentinella della Morte) (2015)
- Giada Learns Italian (2015)
- Michael Sedge's The EURAFSWA Report: Host Nation, Local Requirements and SOFAs for Government Contractors (2019)

He authored the screenplay "The Vatican Diary", several non-fiction books including Ascent to Failure, and the novel Death Watch. Co-authored with Joel Jacobs, Death Watch at one point was being considered by four major film production companies. He also publishes the quarterly Market Abroad newsletter and founded the "Dolce Vita Writer's Holiday" workshop in Italy.

=== Awards ===
His non-fiction work The Lost Ships of Pisa won the President of the Italian Republic's Book of the Year Award for a Foreign Author.

In 2014, his novel, The Oracle, won the Paris Book Festival Best Fiction Award.

=== Films and Television Productions ===
- It Is What It Is (Film 2020)
- Song of the Fly (Film 2022)
- Guardians of the Gods (TV Series 2023)
- My Italian Kitchen (TV Series)
- Vodun (Film)

=== Affiliations ===
- American Society of Journalists and Authors - Director-at-Large
- International Food, Wine & Travel Writers Association - former Regional President
- Society of American Military Engineers
- Independent Book Publishers Association
- Former Regional President of the American Chamber of Commerce in Italy
- Former Board Member-at-Large American Chamber of Commerce in the Kingdom of Bahrain
- Founder and President of the American Business Council of Djibouti

== Personal life ==
Two years after becoming a legal resident of southern Italy, Sedge married Gabriella Giugliano in 1976. Together they have two children, Amanda and Daniele Sedge. He also has five grandchildren, Luca, Matteo, Giada, Esmé, and Rowan. Sedge retains his U.S. citizenship.
