= Orient Securities =

Chinese company

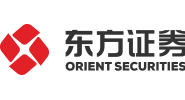
- Company type: Public
- Traded as: SSE: 600958 (A share); SEHK: 3958 (H share); CSI Midcap 200
- Industry: Financial services
- Founded: 1998
- Headquarters: Shanghai
- Area served: Mainland China, Hong Kong
- Services: investment banking; brokerage; asset management
- Revenue: ▲CN¥15.435 billion (2015)
- Operating income: ▲CN¥9.394 billion (2015)
- Net income: ▲CN¥7.325 billion (2015)
- Total assets: ▲CN¥207.898 billion (2015)
- Total equity: ▲CN¥34.958 billion (2015)
- Owner: Shenergy Group (30.08%); Haiyan Investment (5.60%)
- Subsidiaries: Citi Orient Securities (66.7%); Orient Finance Holdings (H.K.) (100%)
- Footnotes / references in a consolidated basis; in Chinese accounting standards

Orient Securities Co., Ltd.
- Simplified Chinese: 东方证券股份有限公司
- Traditional Chinese: 東方證券股份有限公司
Transcriptions
Standard Mandarin
- Hanyu Pinyin: Dōng fāng zhèng quàn gǔ fèn yǒu xiàn gōng sī
Yue: Cantonese
- Jyutping: dung1 fong1 zing3 hyun3 gu2 fan6 jau5 haan6 gung1 si1

Orient Securities
- Simplified Chinese: 东方证券
- Traditional Chinese: 東方證券
Transcriptions
Standard Mandarin
- Hanyu Pinyin: Dōng fāng zhèng quàn
Yue: Cantonese
- Jyutping: dung1 fong1 zing3 hyun3

Orient Securities, also known as DFZQ, is a Chinese investment bank and brokerage firm founded in 1998 and headquartered in Shanghai. The company is a constituent of SSE 50 Index, the blue chip index of Shanghai Stock Exchange.

It provided services in securities, futures, asset management, wealth management, investment banking, investment advisory, and securities research. It was listed on the Shanghai Stock Exchange on 23 March 2015 and on the Hong Kong Stock Exchange in 2016.

== See also ==
- Securities industry in China
