= Chaole =

Chaole 抄乐镇
- Town
- Location within Guizhou Location within China
- Coordinates: 27°40′10″N 107°33′43″E
- Country: China
- Province: Guizhou
- Prefecture-level city: Zunyi
- County: Meitan County
- Postal code: 564102

Chaole (Chinese: 抄乐; pinyin: Chāolè) is a town in Meitan County, Zunyi, Guizhou, China. Chaole has an agricultural service center. As of 2020, it administers Luohuatun (落花屯) Residential Neighborhood and the following five villages:

- Ganxi Village (干溪村)
- Shatang Village (沙塘村)
- Heping Village (河坪村)
- Qunxing Village (群星村)
- Qunfeng Village (群丰村)

== See also ==
- List of township-level divisions of Guizhou
