= Maoping, Meitan County =

Maoping 茅坪镇
- Town
- Location within Guizhou Location within China
- Coordinates: 27°30′4″N 107°23′35″E
- Country: People's Republic of China
- Province: Guizhou
- Prefecture-level city: Zunyi
- County: Meitan County
- Time zone: UTC+8 (China Standard)

Maoping (Chinese: 茅坪; pinyin: Máopíng) is a town under the administration of Meitan County, Guizhou, China. As of 2018, it has one residential community and 3 villages under its administration.

== See also ==
- List of township-level divisions of Guizhou
