= Double Happiness (calligraphy) =

Chinese character representing wishes of happiness

Double happiness in a circular shape.

Double happiness on a woven mat

Double Happiness (simplified Chinese: 双喜; traditional Chinese: 雙喜; pinyin: shuāngxǐ; Vietnamese: song hỷ) sometimes translated as Double Happy, is a Chinese traditional ornament design, commonly used as a decoration symbol of marriage. Outside of China, it is also used in the United States, Europe, East Asia and Southeast Asia by members of the Overseas Chinese and Vietnamese communities.

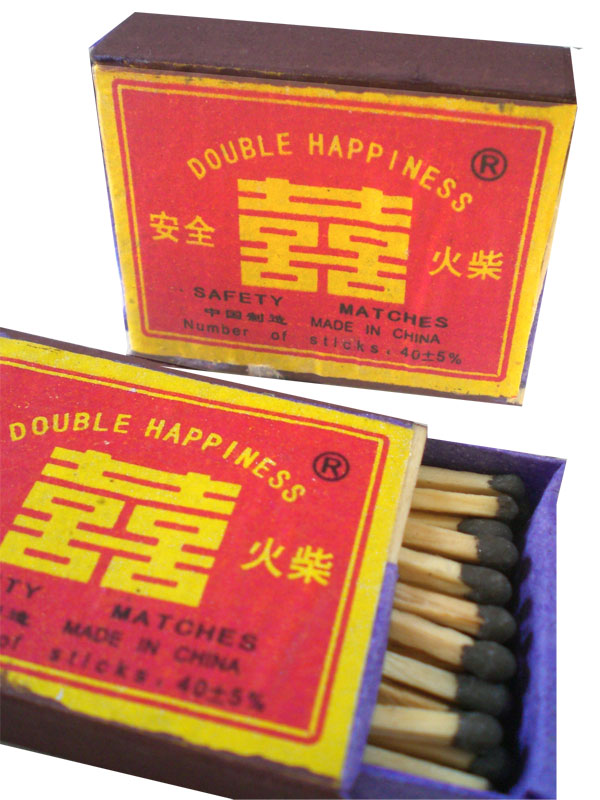
Old matchboxes with double happiness design

== Characteristics ==
Double Happiness is a ligature, "囍" composed of 喜喜 – two copies of the Chinese character 喜 (xǐ) meaning joy, compressed to assume the square shape of a standard Chinese character (much as a real character may consist of two parts). It is pronounced simply as xǐ or as a polysyllabic Chinese character, being read as 双喜 (shuāngxǐ).

Typically the character "囍" is written in Chinese calligraphy, and frequently appears on traditional decorative items, associated with marriage. The double happiness symbol is often found all over wedding ceremonies, as well as on gift items given to the bride and groom. The color of the character is usually red, gold, and occasionally black.

Since 2017, the version 10 of the Unicode Standard features a rounded version of the character in the "Enclosed Ideographic Supplement" block, at code point U+1F264 🉤 ROUNDED SYMBOL FOR SHUANGXI.

== In popular culture ==
Nowadays shuāngxǐ (Wade-Giles: shuang hsi) is used as a brand name for things like fashion, jewelry, cigarettes, matches, soy sauce, etc. It is also featured as decoration on many items by Hong Kong luxury brand Shanghai Tang.

Hong Kong lifestyle retail store G.O.D. designs many products themed with the double happiness symbol, including scented candles, accessories and Ming-inspired tableware and tea sets.

== Gallery ==
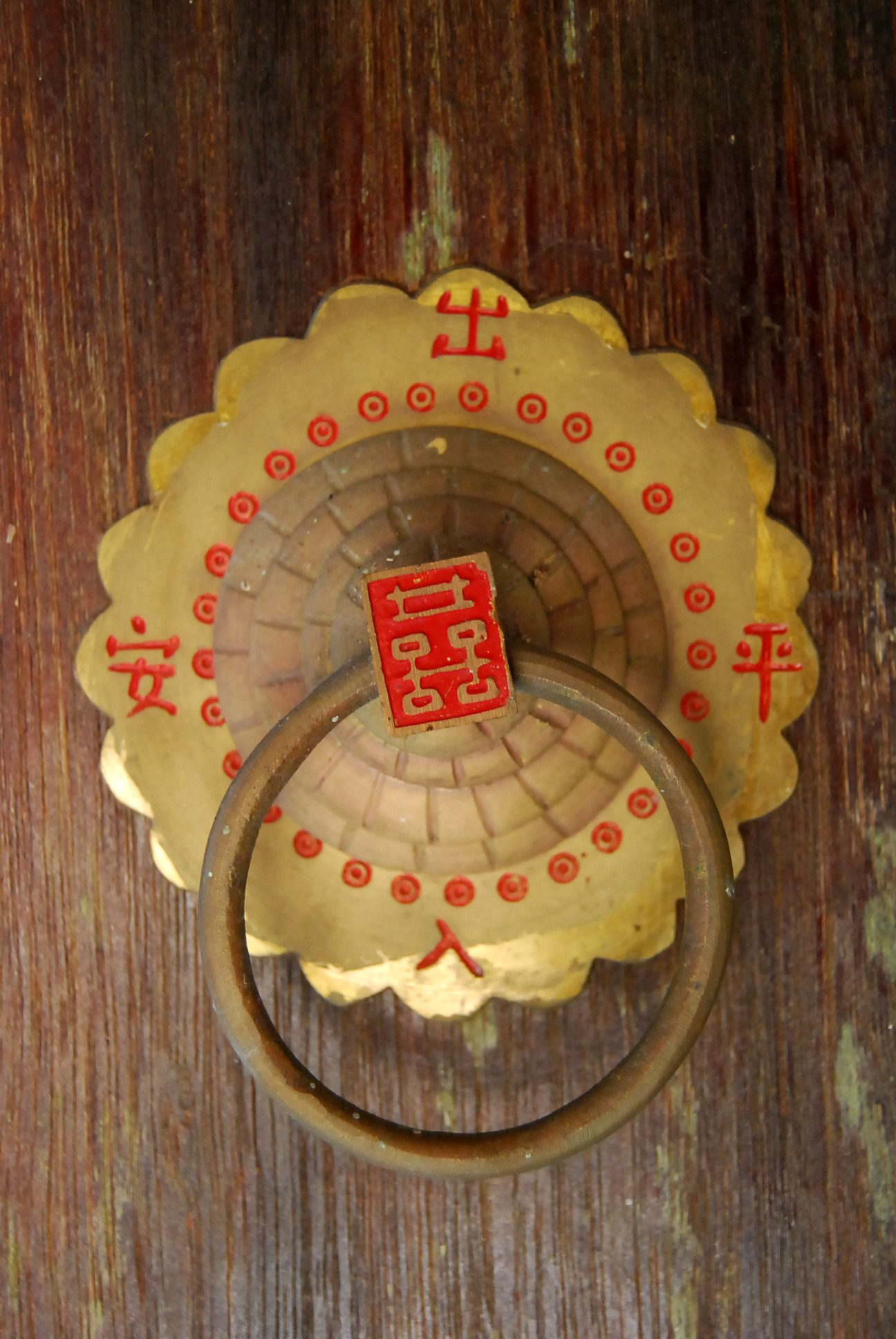
A double happiness character on the door ring of Soong Ching-ling's ancestral home in Wenchang, Hainan

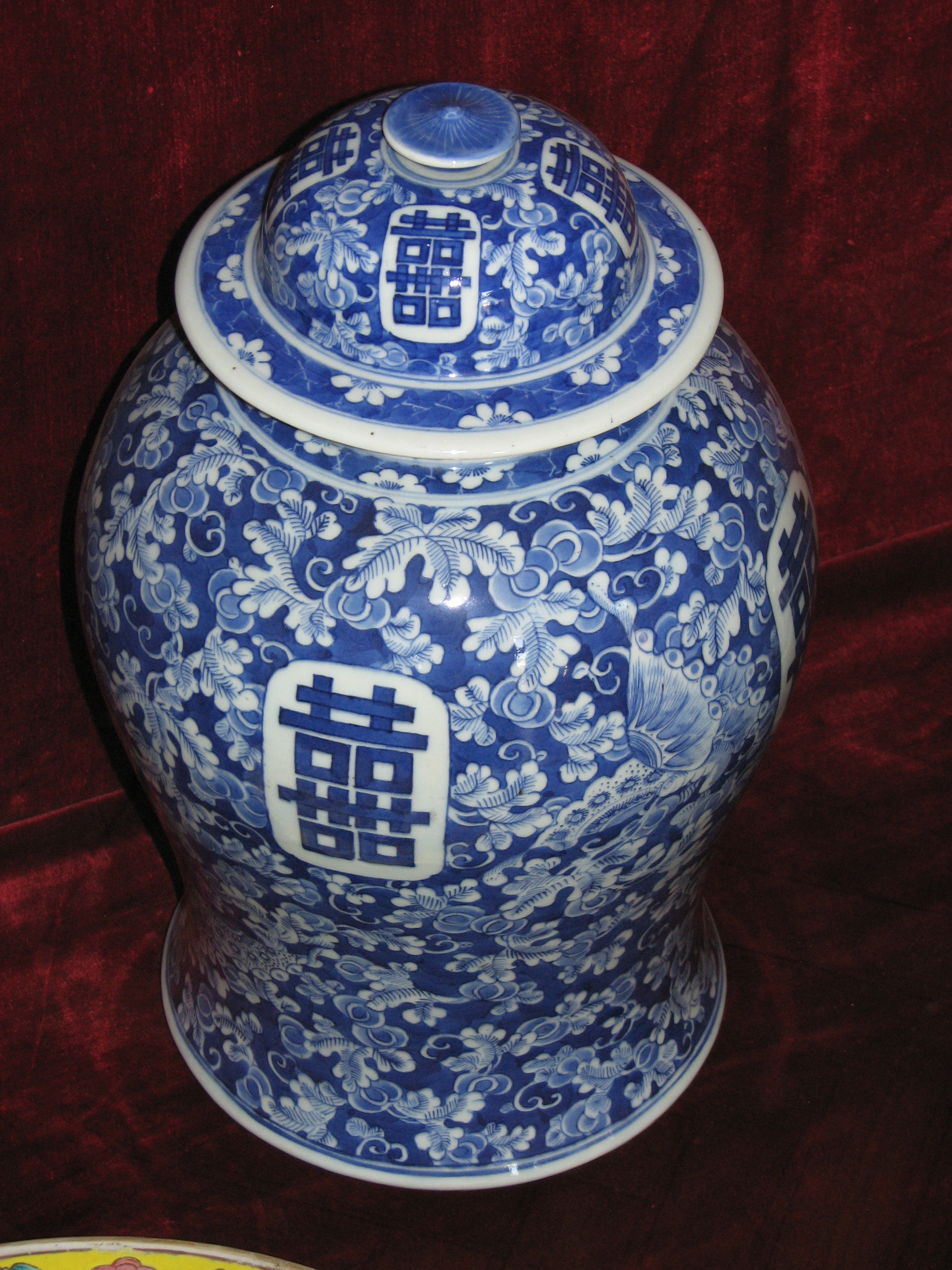
A porcelain vase from the Qing dynasty with double happiness characters

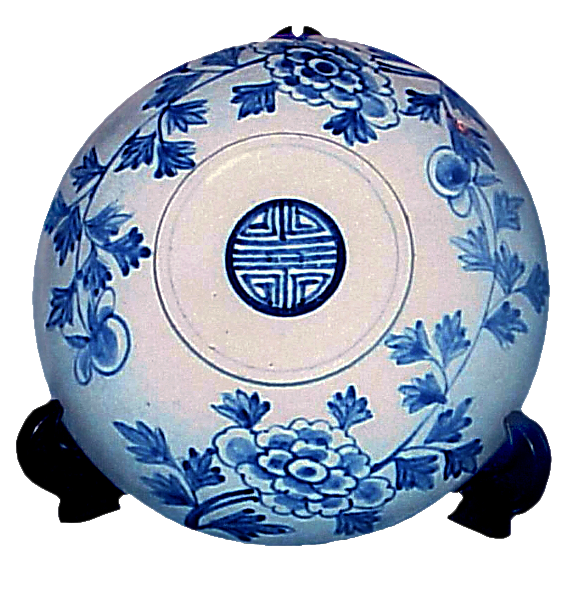
Rice bowl cover decorated with a medallion of the double happiness and longevity (Shou) symbol in the center, from Joseon dynasty Korea

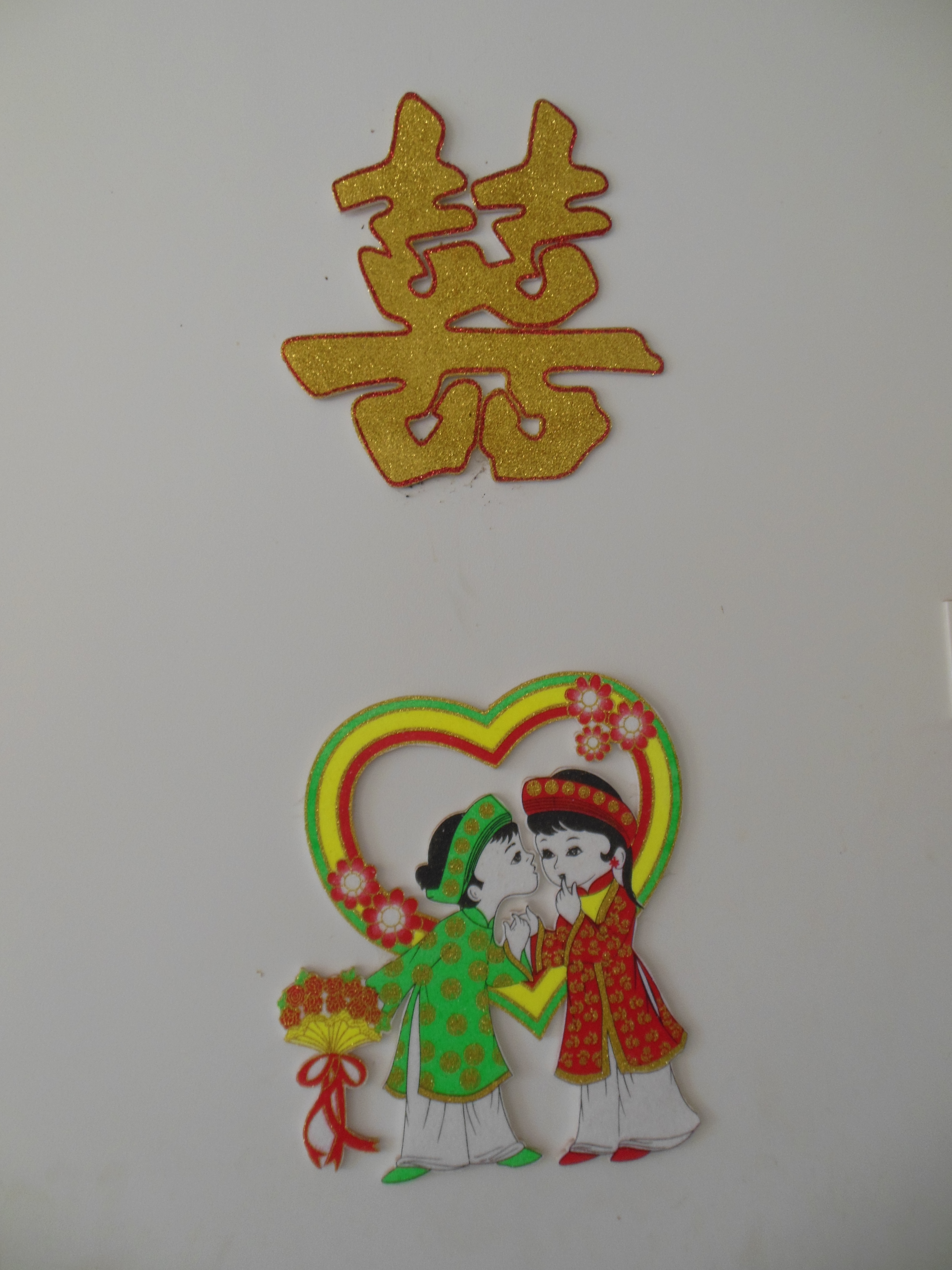
A Vietnamese wedding decoration, with a double happiness character

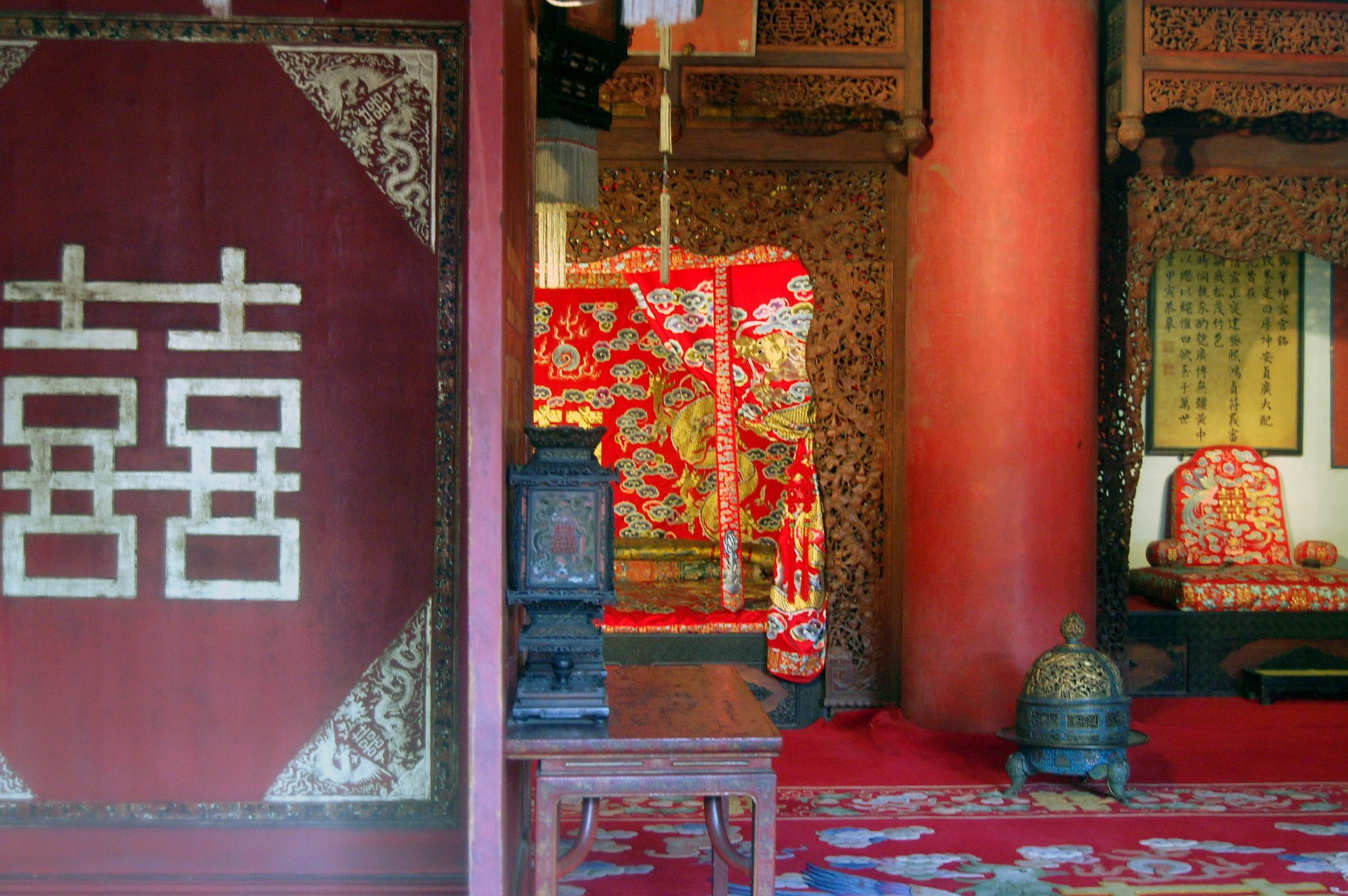
Palace of Earthly Tranquility (坤宁宫) of the Forbidden City, with traditional Chinese wedding decorations and a double happiness character in the foreground

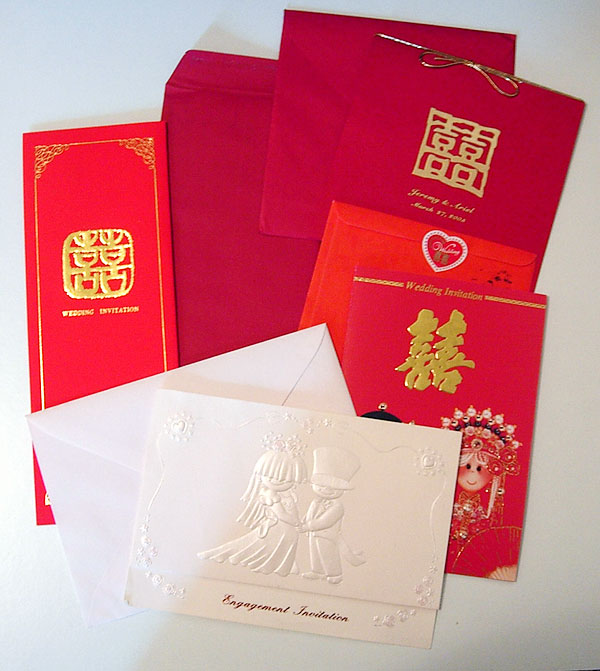
Chinese wedding invitation cards with double happiness characters

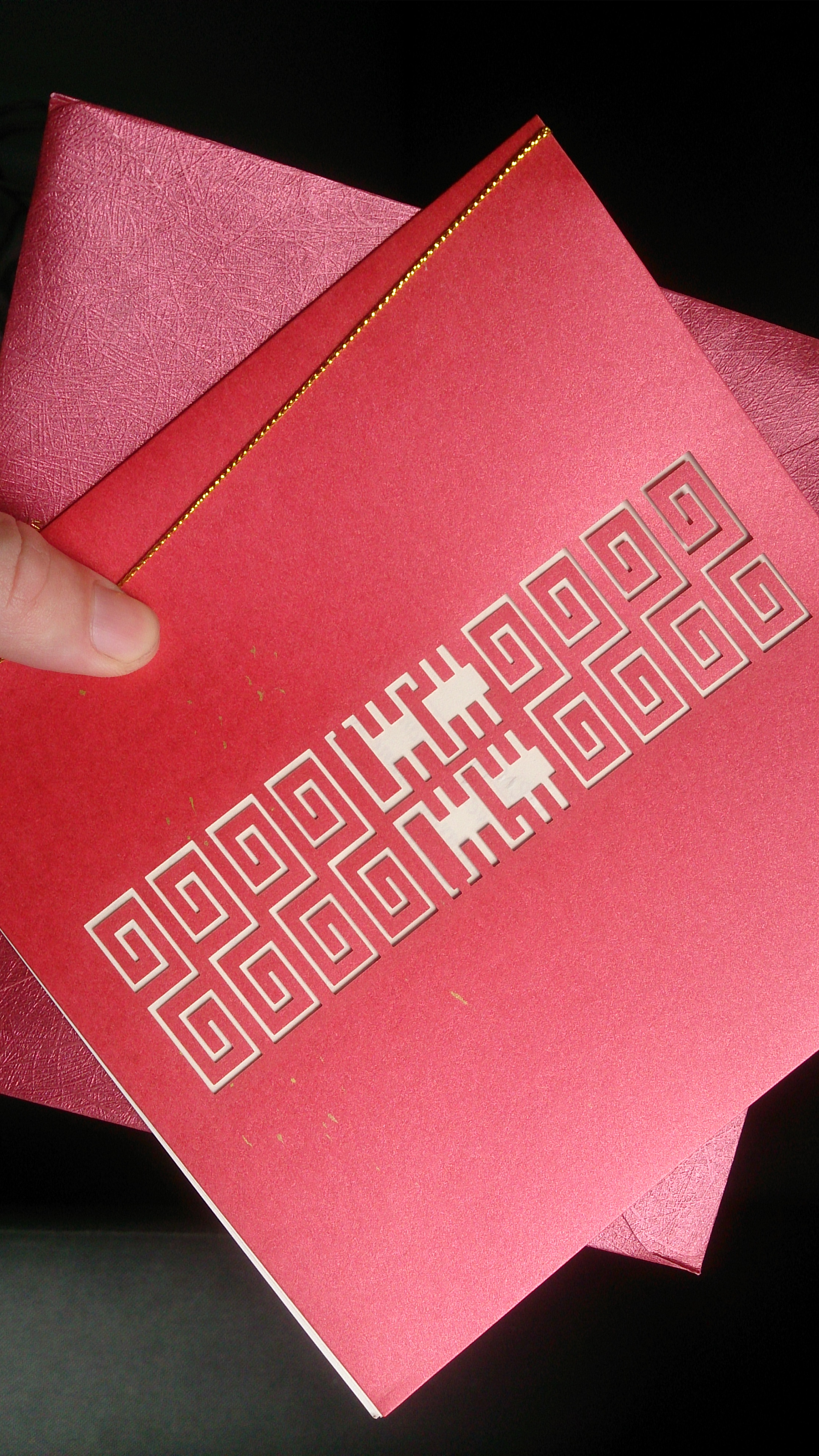
Chinese wedding invitation card with a double happiness character in the center

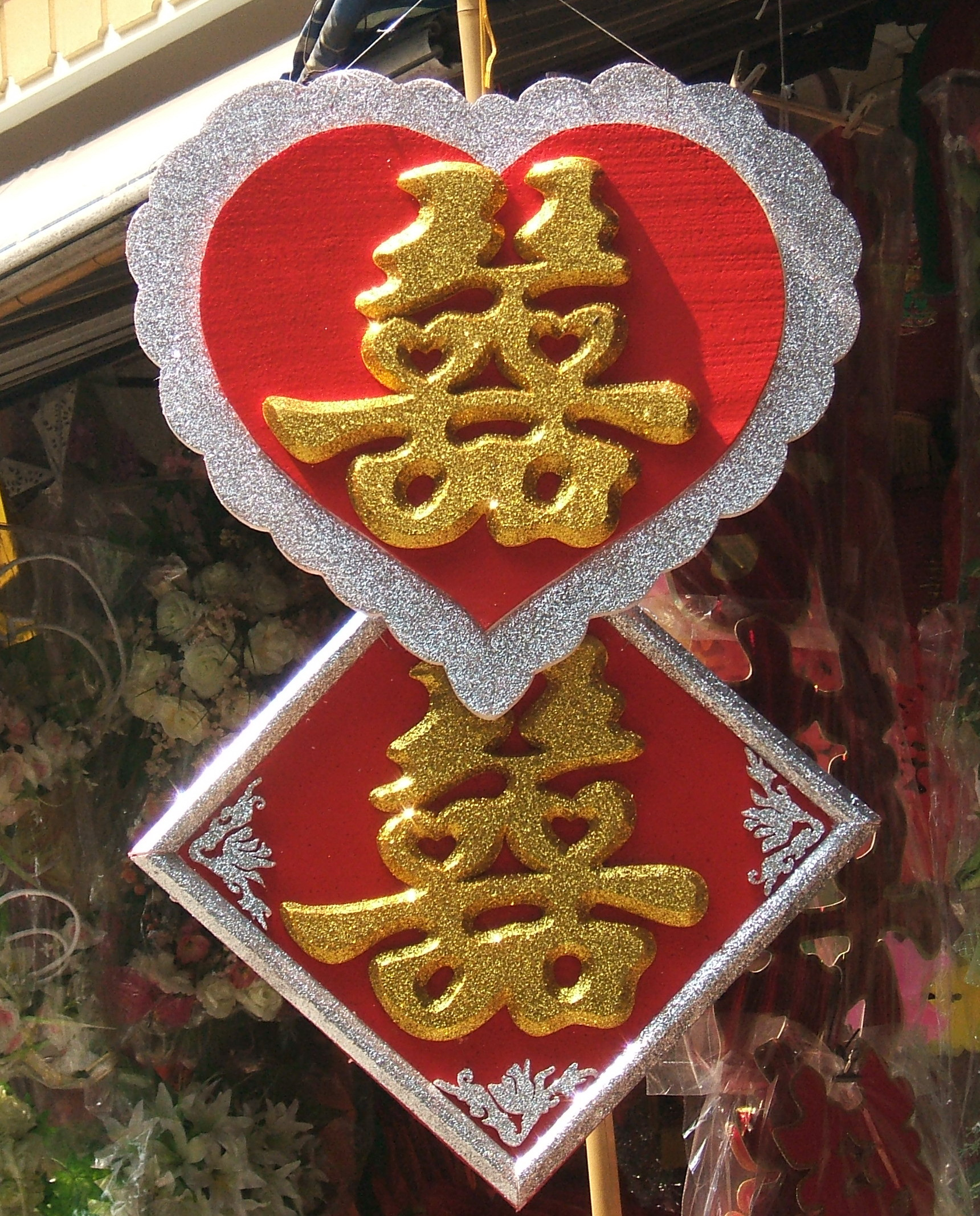
Heart-shaped double happiness decorations in Vietnam

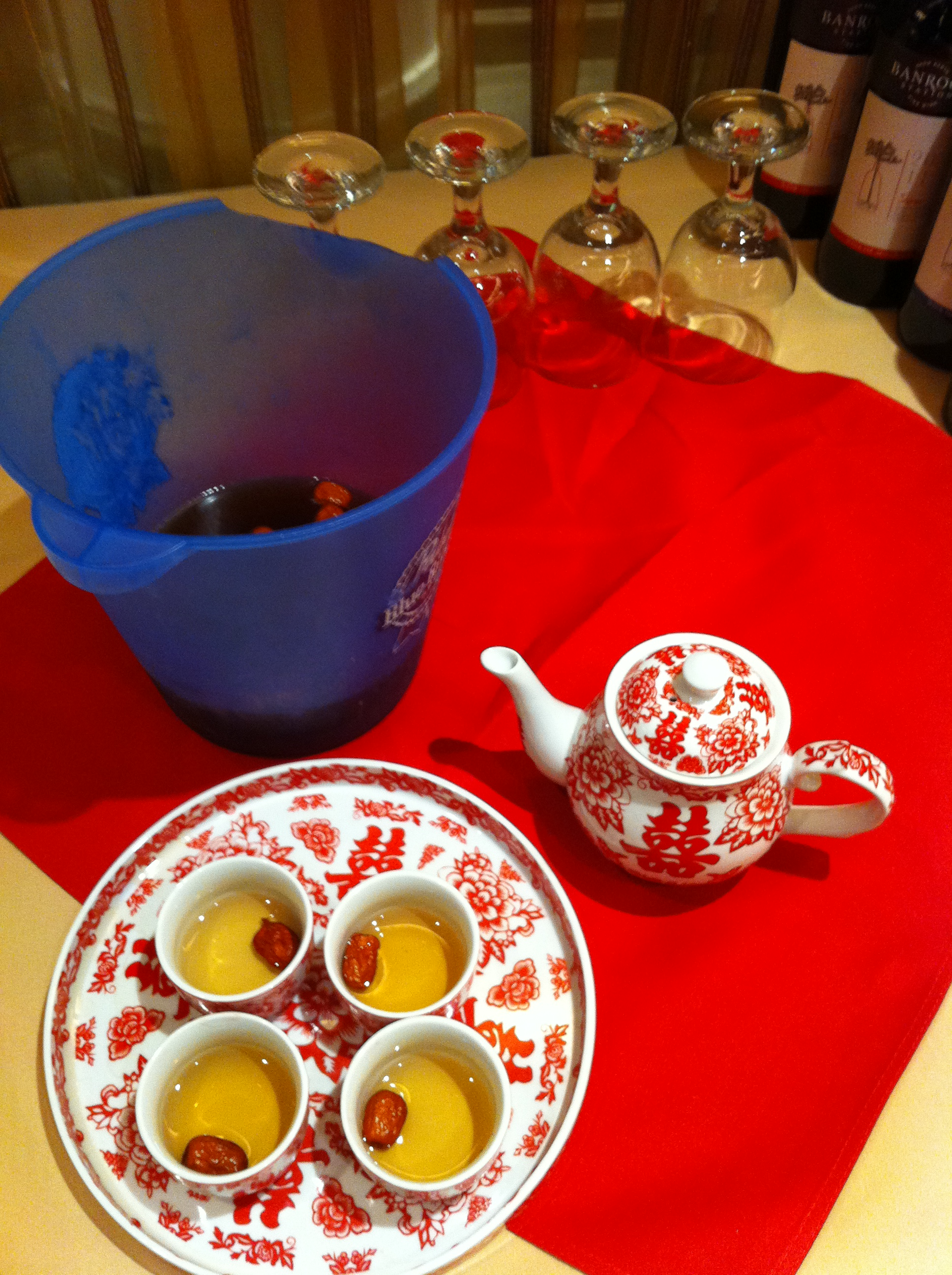
Chinese wedding ceremony teaware, with double happiness characters on them

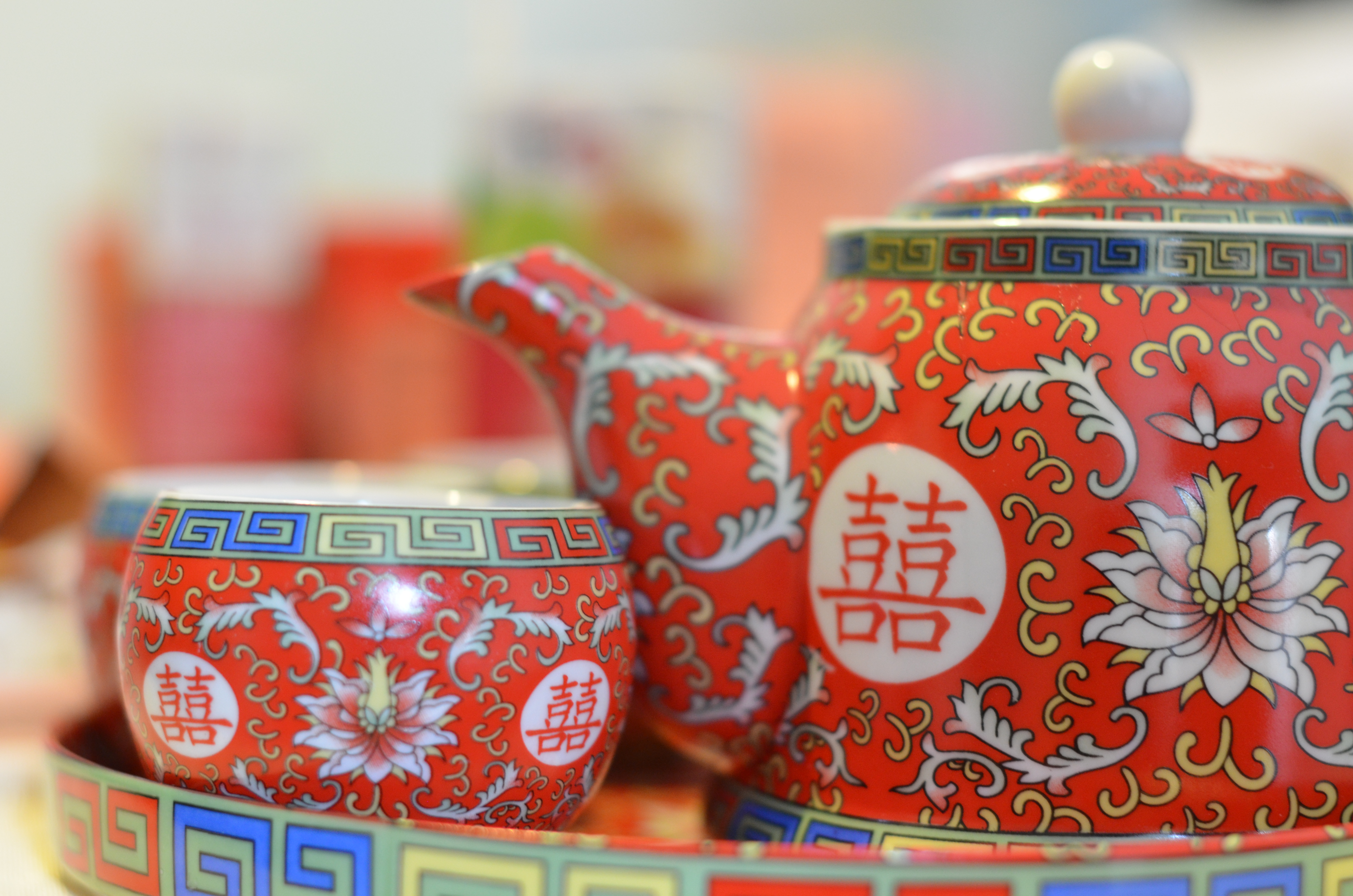
Chinese wedding ceremony teaware

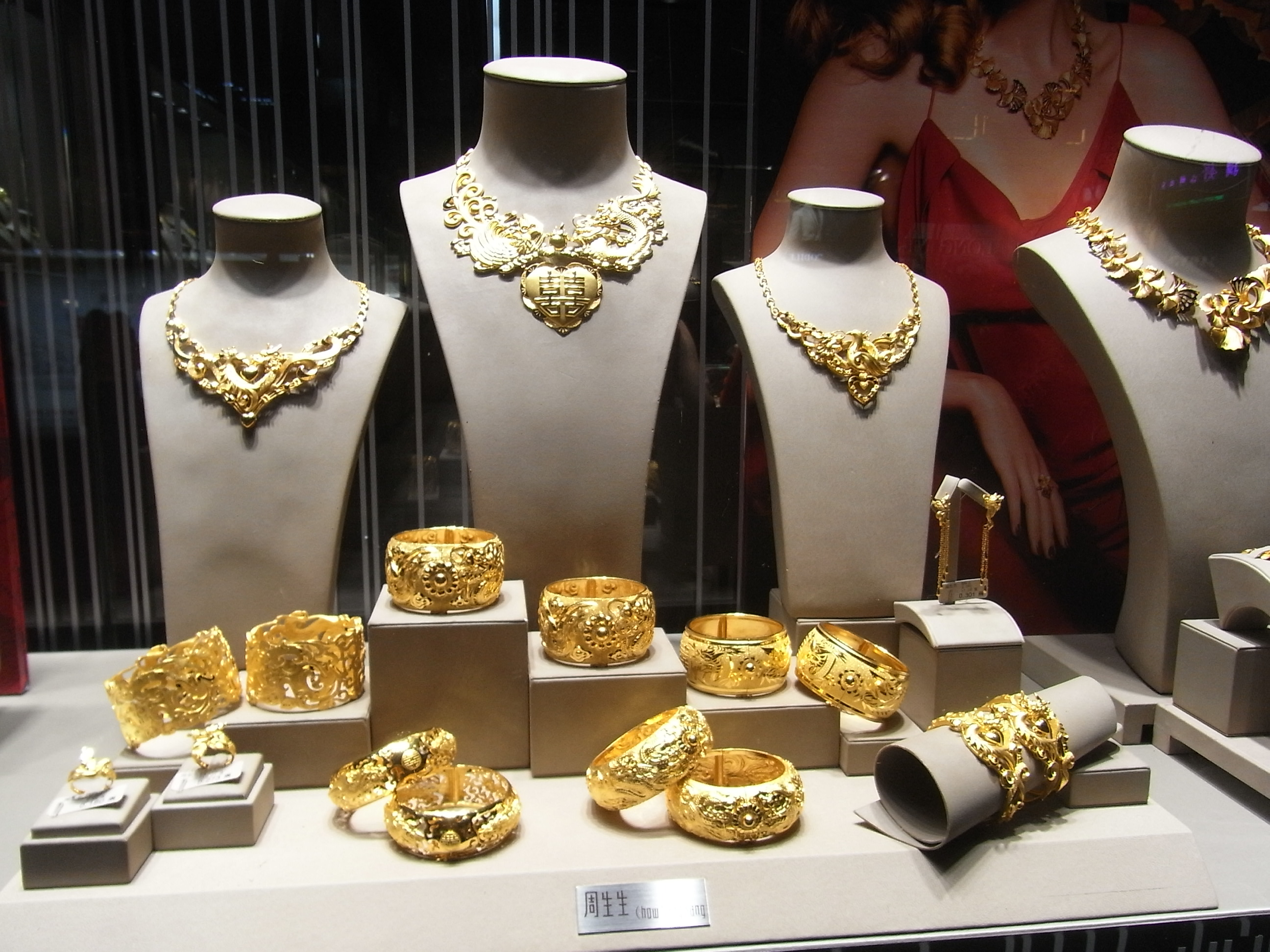
Gold jewelry with double happiness character, Hong Kong

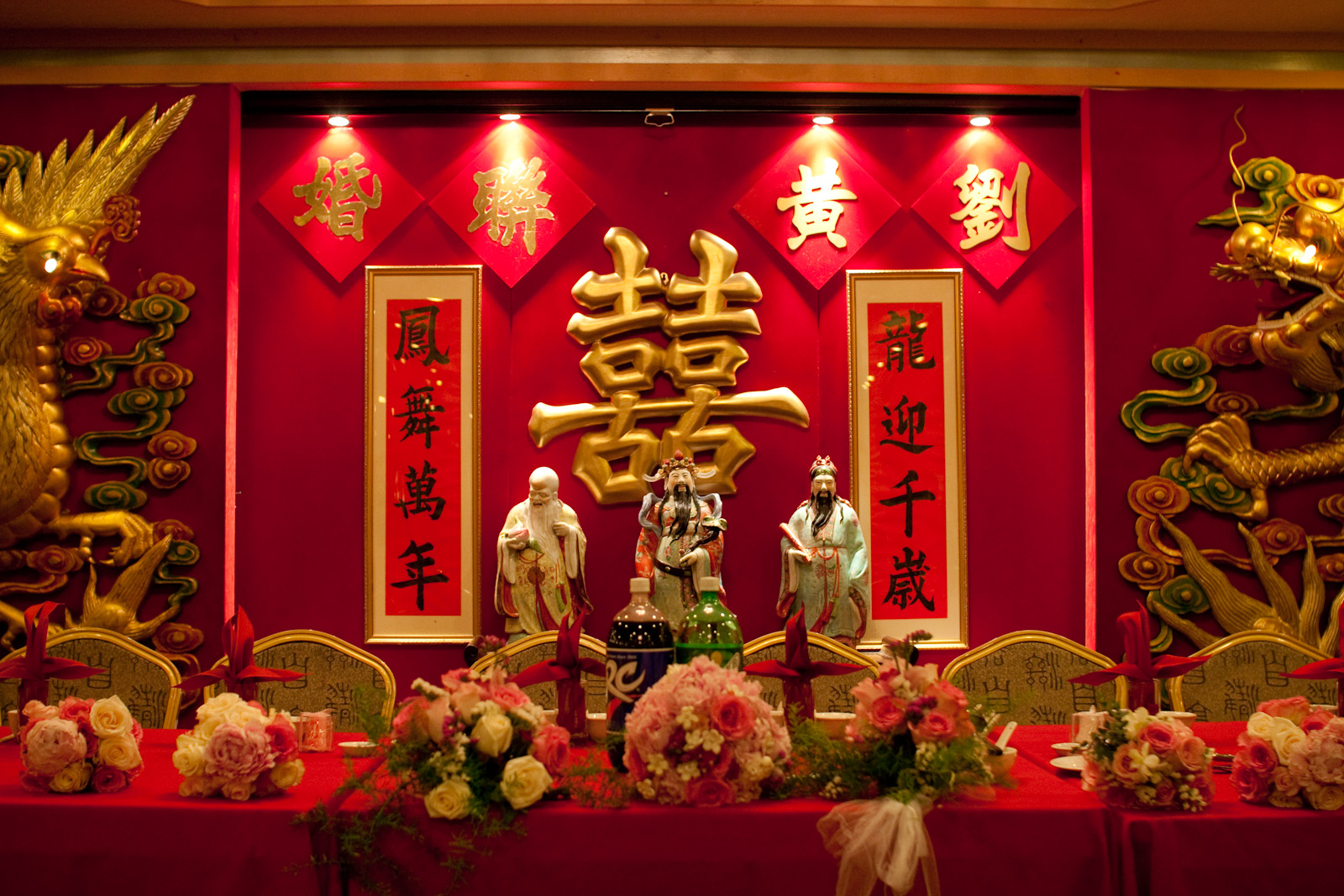
A traditional Chinese wedding reception, with double happiness decoration in the middle

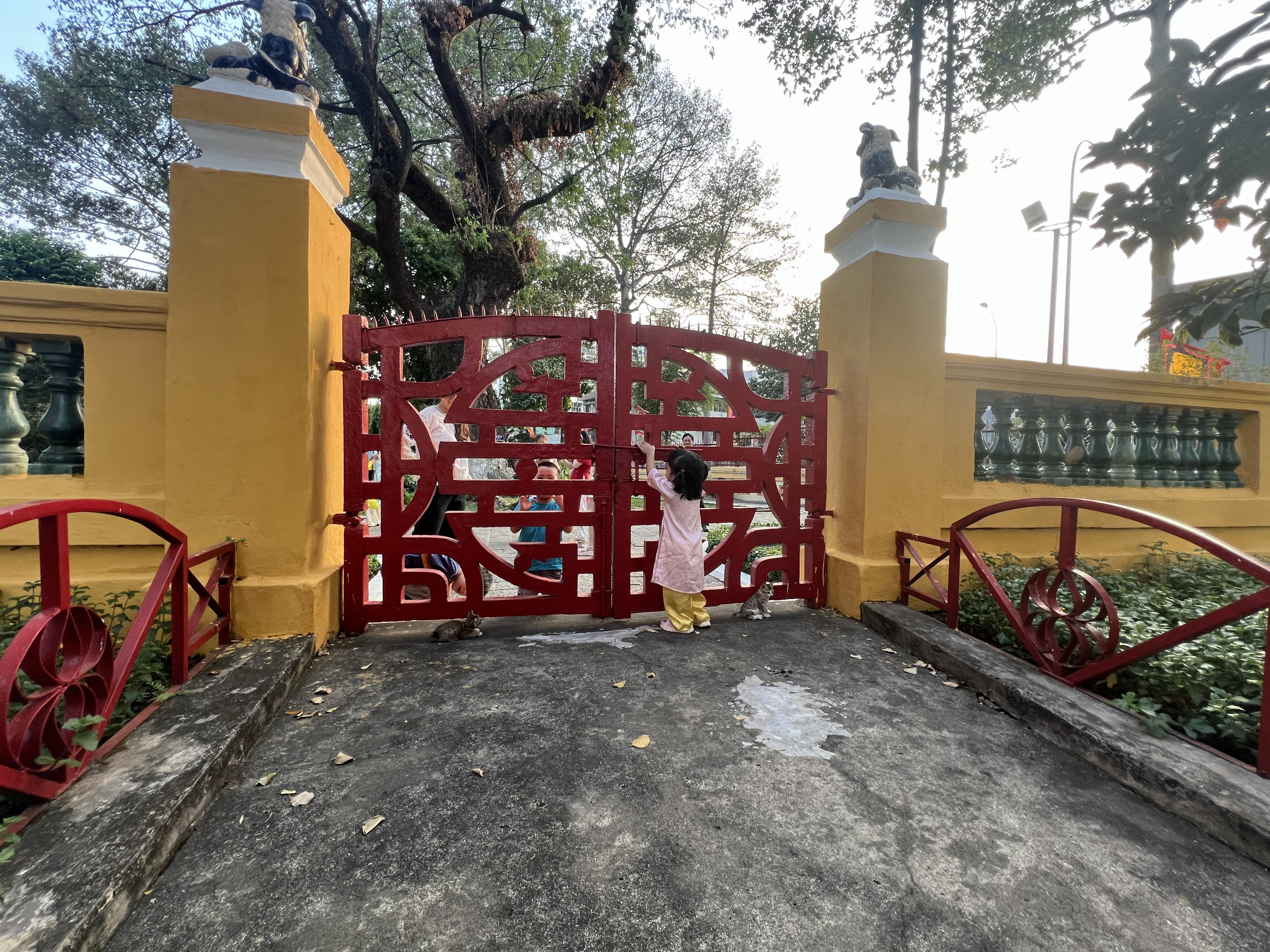
Double Happiness gate at Tomb of Le Van Duyet, Ho Chi Minh City, Vietnam, taken during the Tet Holiday of 2024.

== See also ==
- Fu character (福), also a common good-luck decorative design
- Lu character (禄), a Chinese character symbolizing prosperity
- Shou character (壽), a Chinese character symbolizing longevity
- Xi character (喜), a Chinese character symbolizing happiness
