= Zhongnanhai (cigarette) =

Chinese brand of cigarette

- An old Chinese pack of Zhongnanhai cigarettes, with a Chinese text promoting the cigarette's sponsorship of Project Hope at the top of the pack.
- Product type: Cigarette
- Produced by: Beijing Tobacco Corporation
- Country: People's Republic of China
- Introduced: 1960s
- Markets: China, Japan

Zhongnanhai (Chinese: 中南海; pinyin: Zhōngnánhǎi) is a Chinese brand of cigarettes, currently owned and manufactured by the Beijing Tobacco Corporation. The name Zhongnanhai is also that of a central government complex in Beijing.

== History ==
Zhongnanhai was launched in the 1960s and it is highly popular and holds a large market share in Beijing. The cigarettes were very popular among young smokers in China. In a popular TV series, Struggle, portraying the lives of people who are struggling to make a living in the capital city of Beijing, its 8 mg version was one of the cigarette products consumed by leading young characters. As a result, Zhongnanhai (8 mg) had become a favorite for young adults who were struggling to have a better life.

Zhongnanhai cigarettes are generally produced in seven varieties: 1 mg, Menthol 1 mg, 3 mg, 5 mg, 8 mg, "Special" 8 mg, and 10 mg, referring to tar content. The official website refers to other varieties such as "12 mg" and "Red", which, however, are reported not to be widely available on the Chinese market. The pack text states that the cigarettes are made with "a choice blend of the world's finest tobaccos and herb".

Zhongnanhai cigarettes used to be specially made cigarettes for Chairman Mao Zedong in late 1960s. Zhongnanhai was originally produced by Beijing Tobacco Corporation in an effort to develop a headlining product that was both commercially and socially successful. However Zhongnanhai cigarettes found in little commercial success as they often found themselves struggling to compete with the wide array of cigarettes already available on the domestic market. Subsequently, in an effort to salvage the China Tobacco mainstay, it was subject to a major product innovation scheme by Beijing tobacco corporation between the late 90s and early 2000s. The reason for such product innovation was highly correlated to Mao Zedong's death as with the passing away of the chairman in the late 70s, sales too began to fall. Thus with a decline of such a prestigious brand that was inherently connected with central headquarters for the Chinese Communist Party, Beijing Tobacco's general manager at the time, Mr. Gu undertook the revolutionary project resulting in a household name that has sat among the best selling cigarettes in China ever since. The Chinese indie-rock band Carsick Cars dedicated a song called "Zhong nan hai" to the cigarette brand.

As of 2012, a pack of Zhongnanhai cigarettes cost less than 10 Chinese Yuan.

== Controversy ==
=== Cancelling of Zhongnanhai as a brand name ===
In 2009, the ThinkTank Research Center for Health Development, an anti-tobacco NGO in China, said it would submit a petition to the Trademark Assessment Commission of the State Administration for Industry and Commerce, asking it to discontinue the use of Zhongnanhai as a brand name for cigarettes.

Wu Yiqun, deputy director of TRCHD, told local media that using Zhongnanhai, which is an honored name representing the Chinese government, as a brand of cigarette is misleading consumers, making them believe that the cigarette brand has been acknowledged by the central government, and hence regarding it as a symbol of high quality and authority. According to Article 10 of China's Trademark Law, names of a central government office location can not be used as a brand. Based on this article, TRCHD would request the trademark authority to cancel the use of Zhongnanhai as a brand. It is learned that on the Zhongnanhai cigarette packets it says that part of the money spent by consumers on each pack of the cigarette will go to Project Hope, a well-known charity program that aims to support students from poor areas. Wu says printing such information on the cigarette packs is also misleading and against Article 5.3 of the Framework Convention on Tobacco Control.

At present, there is no rule in China to manage the charity initiatives of tobacco companies. Ultimately, the claim was rejected by the court.

== See also ==
- Chunghwa
- Double Happiness
