= Chinese Daily News =

Chinese Daily News may refer to the following:

- The English subtitle of the World Journal, in North America.
- The former name of the United Daily, Sarawak Tribune's sister newspaper, in Malaysia.

== See also ==
- China Daily News (disambiguation)
