= Shanghai Tobacco Group =

Chinese tobacco company

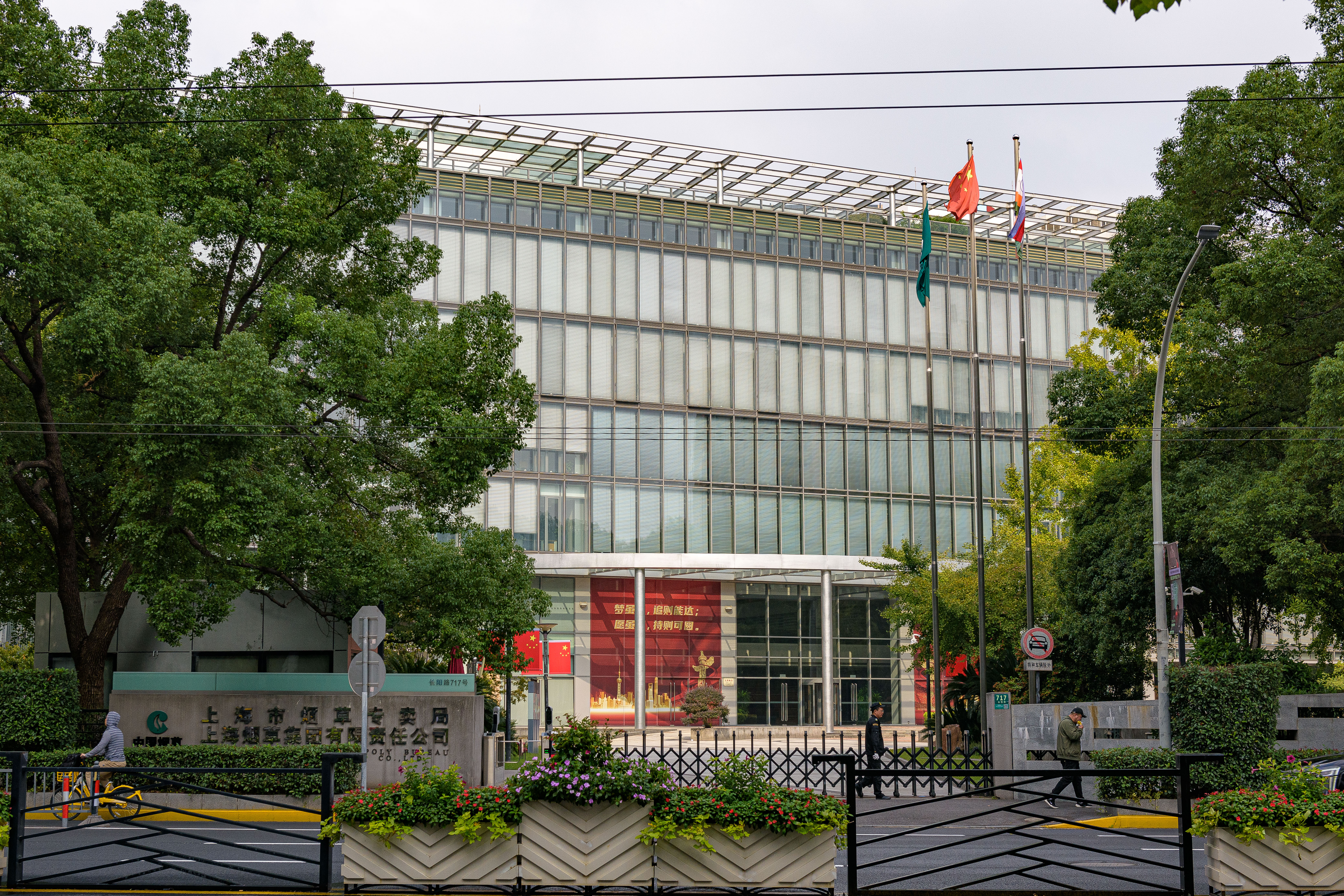
Headquarters

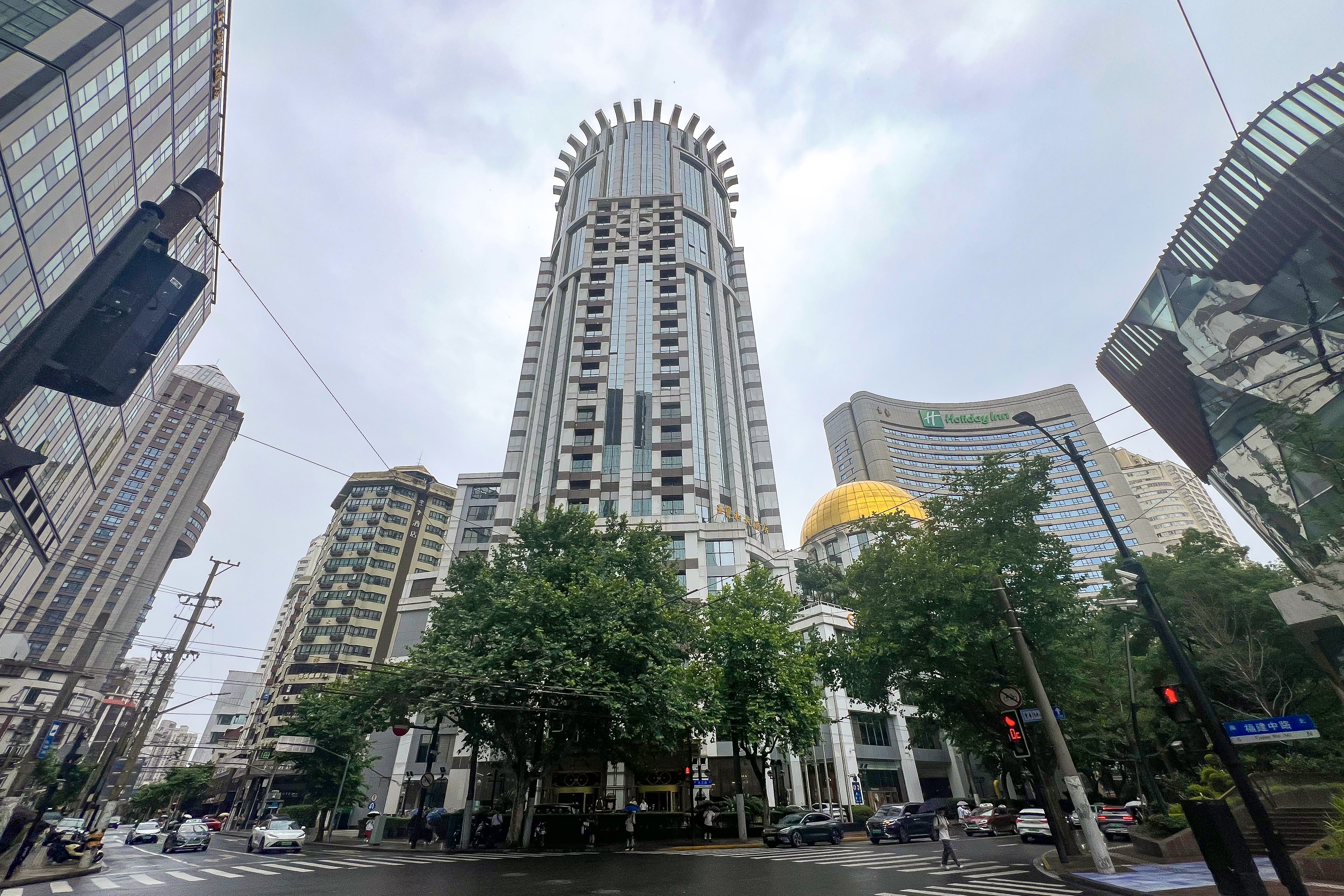
Central Hotel Shanghai owned by Shanghai Tobacco Group

Shanghai Tobacco Group Co., Ltd. is a subsidiary of state-owned China Tobacco. The company produced Chunghwa, Double Happiness, Zhongnanhai and other brands. The company is also a minority shareholder of Bank of Communications, Orient Securities, Haitong Securities and China Pacific Insurance Company via Shanghai Haiyan Investment Management.
