= Yuquan Subdistrict, Meitan County =

Yuquan Subdistrict 鱼泉街道
- Subdistrict
- Location in Guizhou
- Coordinates: 27°52′3″N 107°28′51″E
- Country: People's Republic of China
- Province: Guizhou
- Prefecture-level city: Zunyi
- County: Meitan County
- Time zone: UTC+8 (China Standard)

Yuquan Subdistrict (Chinese: 鱼泉街道; pinyin: Yúquán Jiēdào) is a subdistrict in Meitan County, Guizhou, China. As of 2020, it administers the following three residential neighborhoods and four villages:

Neighborhoods

- Yuquan
- Yuhe (鱼合)
- Xinshi (新石)

Villages

- Xiangushan Village (仙谷山村)
- Lianhe Village (联合村)
- Jinqiao Village (金桥村)
- Tutang Village (土塘村)

== See also ==
- List of township-level divisions of Guizhou
