= Ted Sioeng =

Indonesian businessman

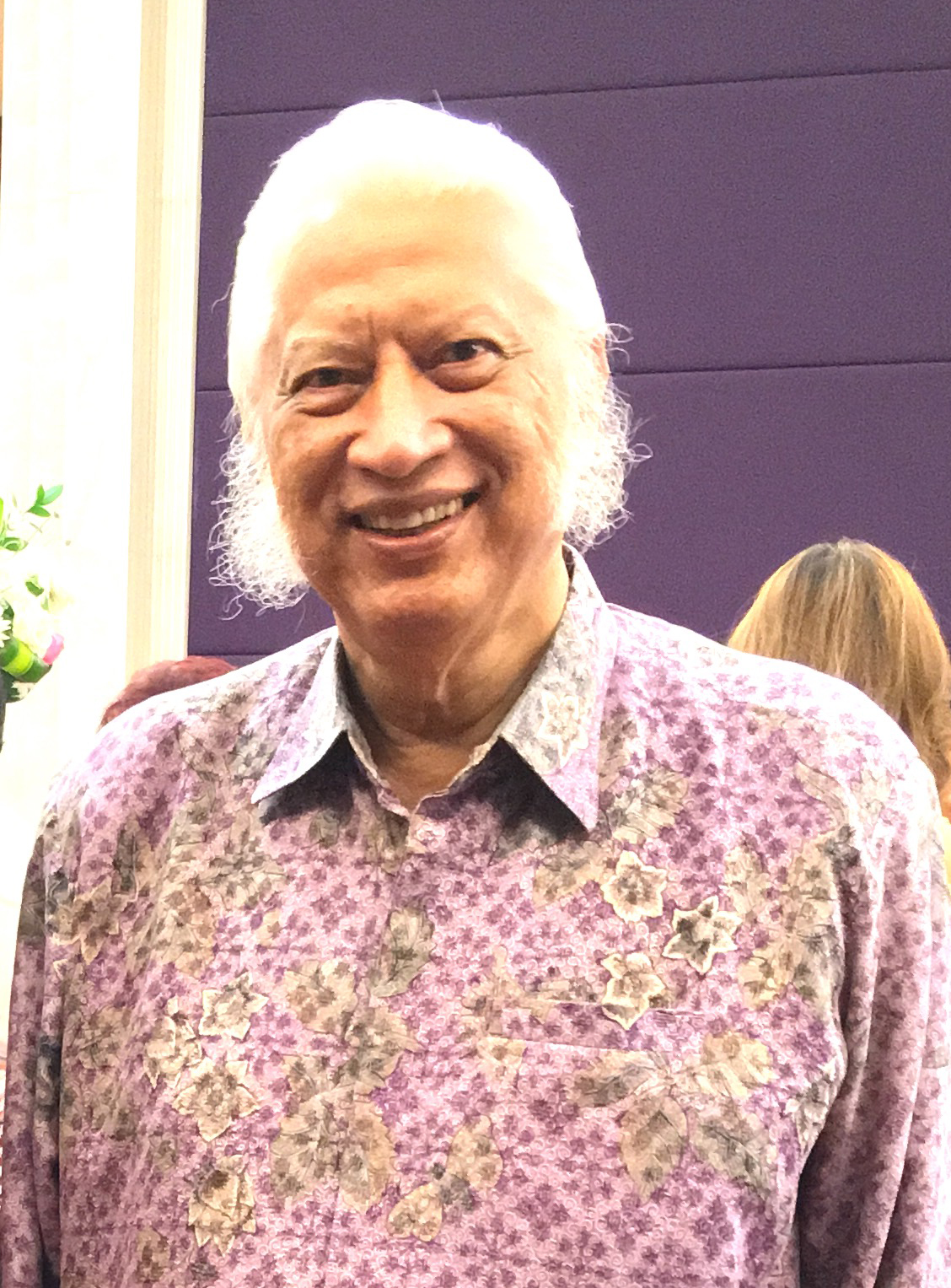
- Born: Xiong Delong 熊德龍; 16 November 1945 (age 81); Indonesia
- Occupation: Entrepreneur

Ted Sioeng (pronounced 'shyong') (Chinese: 熊德龍; pinyin: Xióng Délóng), also known as Xiong Delong and Sioeng San Wong, is an Indonesian businessman with interests in the United States, China, Vietnam and other parts of Asia, worth around US$500 million.

== Background ==
Sioeng grew up in Indonesia. Raised in an ethnically Chinese family, he has a strong affinity for China, which is now the focus of his business interests, while he also admires the United States - he and his family have been based in Los Angeles since 1987.

== Business interests ==
While in his 20s, Sioeng became successful selling foam rubber padding. In the 1970s, he was quick to recognize that money could be made in emerging China and he built a multimillion-dollar fortune selling the Chinese used factory equipment – such as for cigarette- and toy-manufacturing and in the medical field – and exporting Chinese cigarettes to the West. In China, he goes by the name Xiong Delong.

He quickly saw that by donating money to good causes, such as to build schools, hospitals, and roads, he could gain favour with local governments. In Yunnan, this approach gained him a license to sell the popular Hongtashan brand of cigarettes – called 'Red Pagoda Mountain' in the U.S. – outside of China. He now runs the business as a (dollar-based) joint venture.

He is owner of the Chinese-language International Daily News, published in the United States and Indonesia.

== U.S. campaign finance controversy ==
Sioeng was a major figure in the 1996 United States campaign finance controversy, notably sitting next to Bill Clinton and Al Gore at fundraising events after having donated to the Democratic Party funds allegedly linked to China. In 1997 the U.S. Congress was informed by the U.S. attorney general, and the directors of the CIA, FBI, and NSA that they had credible intelligence information indicating Sioeng was an agent of China.

According to an unclassified final draft of a report by the US Senate committee then investigating campaign finance abuses, half of the $400,000 given to the Democrats by Sioeng and his family was "funded by transfer from overseas accounts," suggesting that the money came from the Chinese government.

== Other legal issues ==
Aside from Bill Clinton campaign scandal, Sioeng was also involved in some legal troubles in his home country Indonesia and was known to be a controversial businessman since the New Order era. In 1990s, Sioeng was accused of calling an arson against property that was insured in which he did to claim its insurance. His action was widely condemned by numerous insurance companies and property developers for damaging reputation to those two business sectors.

In 2014, Sioeng's company applied to Mayapada Bank for a 203 billion rupiah (around US$17.5 million). However, during its loan process, the credit was said to be a bad credit and Sioeng's company was declared bankrupt by 2023. As a result, for his action, Ted was named a suspect for fraud and embezzlement and was declared as fugitive after he fled the country.

== Arrest and trials ==
After being an Interpol fugitive since April 2023 for bad credit case against Mayapada with the amount of 1.550 trillion rupiah (US$95.3 million), Sioeng was arrested in China who was in hiding under the alias of Gatot S with Belizean passport. Sioeng landed in Jakarta in November 2024 and was taken to Kramat Jati Police Hospital afterward for a medical checkup. Sioeng was charged for credit fraud against Mayapada that caused 133 billion rupiah (US$8.172 million) and was sentenced 3 years in prison due to his proven fraud and refusal to cooperate with the law but judges also commuted his sentencing due to his old age and he said to have returned 70 billion rupiah (US$4.3 million) to Mayapada.

== Family and personal life ==
Sioeng, who is ethnically a Gurkha descent, began his life in an orphanage. He was adopted and brought up (in Indonesia) by an Indonesian Chinese couple, which led to his interests in China.

He is married with five children, including his eldest, daughter Jessica Elnitiarta, who headed the family interests in California and was also involved in the Clinton controversy, having donated $300,000, some of which was alleged to have been Chinese government money.

Mr. Ted Sioeng holds a Singapore passport but his wife and children are permanent U.S. residents. He is able to speak good Mandarin and English.
