= Hongtashan =

Chinese cigarette brand

- An old Chinese pack of Hongtashan cigarettes, with a Chinese text warning at the bottom of the pack.
- Product type: Cigarette
- Produced by: Hongta Group
- Country: China
- Introduced: 1959; 67 years ago
- Markets: China, Hong Kong

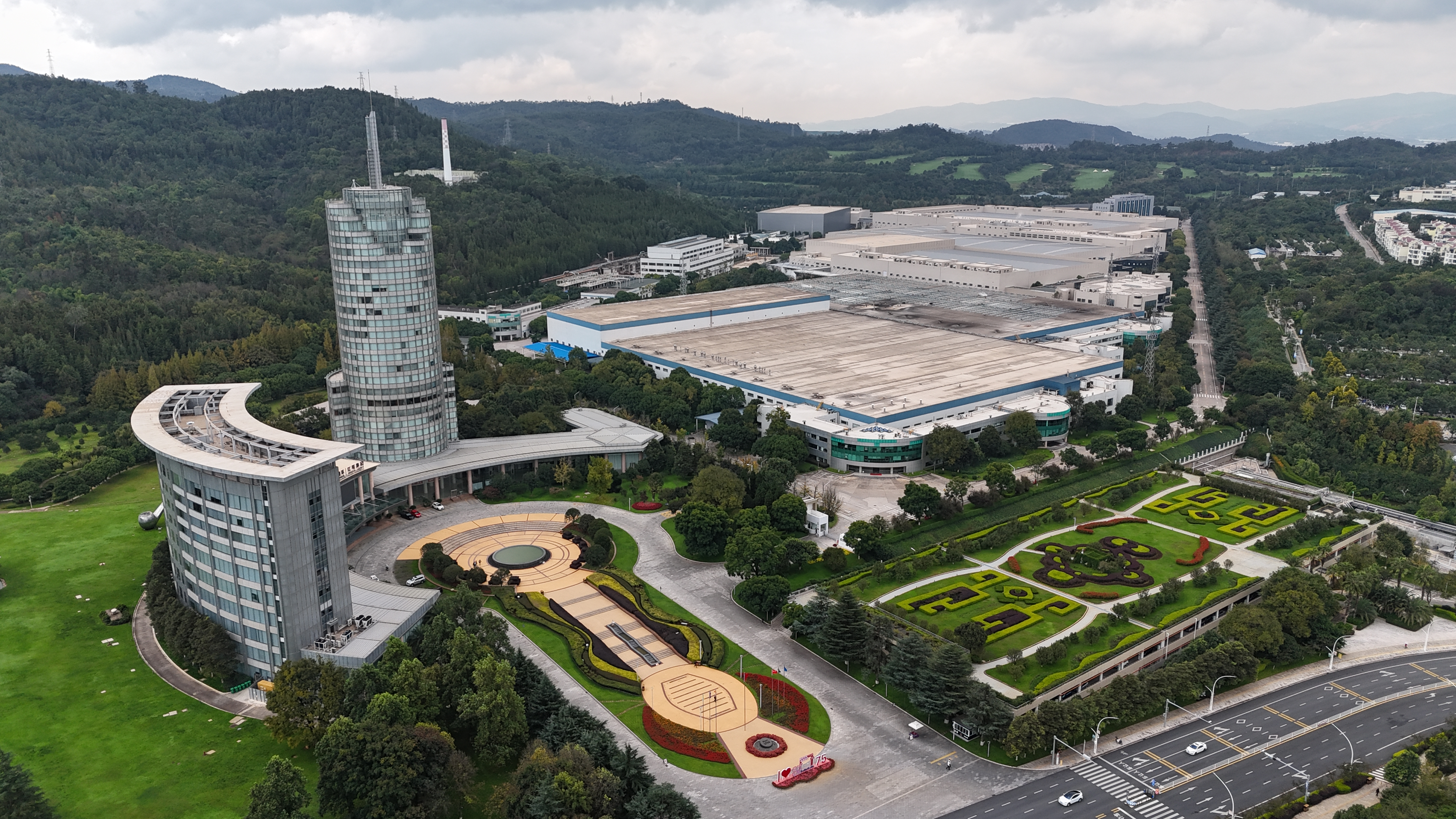
Headquarter of Hongta Group

Hongtashan (simplified Chinese: 红塔山; traditional Chinese: 紅塔山; pinyin: Hóngtǎshān) is a Chinese brand of cigarettes. It is owned and manufactured by Hongta Group, and was formerly known as Yuxi Cigarette Factory. The brand was founded as a gift contributing to the 10th anniversary of the Chinese Communists winning the Chinese Civil War and the proclamation of the People's Republic of China.

== History ==
Hongtashan was launched in 1959 and gets its name from the location of its main production facility, Hongtashan Hill ('Red Pagoda Hill') in Yuxi. The cigarettes are made with a flue-cured tobacco type and therefore sugar and nicotine levels are relatively high. Hongtashan cigarettes are mainly sold in China, though the export business is still a major operation, under the control of Indonesian businessman Ted Sioeng. In the United States, the brand is sold as 'Red Pagoda Mountain'.

In 2001, Hongtashan was awarded "China's Most Valuable Brand" for 7 consecutive years by the People's Daily, beating household appliances brand Haier.

In 2004, Hong Kong-based distributor Silver Base Sales Manager Alex Chung (left) and Marco Tse, reported that they wanted to export the Hongtashan Premium variant to European and U.S. based Duty Free airport shops after the ease of visa restrictions for Chinese abroad. Retailers from Heathrow Airport, Charles de Gaulle Airport, San Francisco International Airport and Amsterdam Airport Schiphol expressed interest in the product during the TFWA World Exhibition 2004, and were firming up the details with Silver Base. Southeast Asian airports began selling the cigarettes from April 2004. Of these locations, Singapore Changi Airport sold the highest volume.

In 2015, Hongtashan won the title of "Yunnan Famous Brand Product" and ranked among the top 500 Chinese brands.

== See also ==
- Chunghwa
- Smoking in China
- China National Tobacco Corp
