= Chunghwa (cigarette) =

Chinese cigarette brand

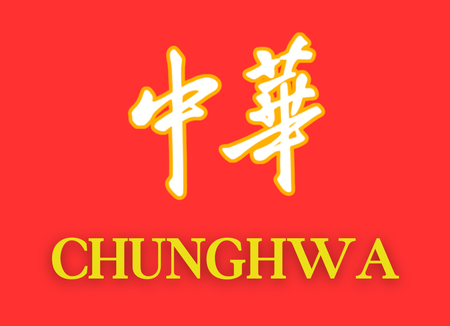
- Product type: Cigarette
- Produced by: Shanghai Tobacco Group; China Tobacco
- Country: People's Republic of China
- Introduced: 1949; 77 years ago
- Markets: See Markets

Chunghwa (simplified Chinese: 中华; traditional Chinese: 中華; pinyin: Zhōnghuá) is a Chinese cigarettes brand produced by the Shanghai Tobacco Group, a subsidiary of China Tobacco. Chunghwa is marketed as a premium brand, the package design is a bright red color with the Tiananmen and its Huabiao pillars in gold on the front. "Chunghwa", or Zhonghua (中华/中華), is one of the common names for China. As a result, advertisements usually use the name as a pun, though this practice has been controversial. For example, the slogan "Love Our Chunghwa" could also be translated as "Love Our China" and could therefore be used as an advertisement.

The cigarettes smell like plums and are reported to have been the preferred cigarette brand of Mao Zedong. The Chunghwa brand can be considered to be a status symbol, and the cigarettes are often given as gifts.

== History ==
In May 1949, shortly after the establishment of the Shanghai Municipal People's Government of Shanghai, the Military Control Commission took over the former Chinese national government tobacco company and set up a state-owned Chinese Tobacco Company.

The company solicited in the "Liberation Daily" newspaper suggestions for the official package logo. After the advertisement was published, many people submitted proposals. The accepted design was of the Tiananmen Gate with a dark red background and a gold five-pointed star, the Tiananmen Gate on both sides with two large Chinese tables, painted below the Golden Water Bridge, in the upper middle printed with "Chunghwa cigarettes," the back of the packaging painted with a base Dahua table in the middle printed with "Chunghwa cigarettes."

On February 13, 1951, the Chinese tobacco company in the "Tobacco Daily" published their first advertisement for their brand.

After the year 1952, the Chinese Tobacco Company was incorporated into the Shanghai Tobacco Company. By March 1953, Chunghwa had a total production of 16,000 boxes.

An old pack of Chunghwa Filter Kings cigarettes, used from 1951 until 2001.

=== Limited supply period ===
Due to the small number of raw materials, Chunghwa production was low during the Cultural Revolution, and its production was lower than the yield of the 1950s.

=== Open supply ===
In 1984, the Shanghai Tobacco Monopoly Bureau and the Shanghai Tobacco Company were established for the implementation of unified management and marketing of the tobacco industry in Shanghai. From 1984 to 1992, Chunghwa sold more than 160,000 cigarettes boxes.

In 1997, Chunghwa had an annual output of 10 million boxes. In 2011 there were sales of more than 900,000 cases. Chunghwa high-end market share in China is more than 50% year-round, and cigarette sales in China for many years have elected Chunghwa as the best brand.

== Controversy ==
=== "I Love China" slogan ===
The "People's Republic of China Advertising Law" and "Tobacco advertising Interim Measures" on tobacco advertising has been strictly limited, so Shanghai Tobacco Group has been using the slogan "I love China" on large outdoor advertising, set to Tiananmen Square as the background. These ads have the words "Love China" and "Shanghai Tobacco Group" for the inscription. Although Shanghai tobacco Group states that this is a public service ad to promote patriotism and not their products, their intentions continue to be questioned. According to a survey, more than half of the people screened said "Chunghwa" [China] should be the name used for publicity of cigarettes. In Shanghai, more than 95% of the sale of tobacco products at shopping malls, supermarkets, convenience stores have "Love China" on the box.

=== 2011 trademark case ===
According to the Article 8(1) of the Chinese Trademark Law (1993 revision), trademarks are not allowed to use the name, flag, or insignia of China, nor are they allowed to use similar terms and shapes. Chunghwa cigarettes not only use one of the several names of China "中华" ("Zhōnghuá" hereafter) as the brand name, but also feature Tiananmen and Huabiao, two symbols of the nation, on the packaging. Lawyer Wang Shiru, arguing that such use is in violation of the law and damages the nation's image, petitioned the Beijing First Intermediate People's Court to invalidate Shanghai Tobacco Group's "Zhōnghuá" trademark. The Court denied Wang's request. The Court opines that the "Zhōnghuá" trademark, in use since 1950 and formally registered in 1979, should not be retroactively subject to China's Trademark Law (the first version of which was released in 1982). As a result, Shanghai Tobacco Group was allowed to continue using the "Zhōnghuá" trademark.

== Markets ==
Chunghwa is mainly sold in China, but also was or still is sold in Hong Kong, Malaysia, Indonesia, Vietnam, Myanmar, Philippines, Georgia and the United Kingdom.

Additionally, Chunghwa cigarettes are available in many airport duty-free shops around the world.

== See also ==
- Zhongnanhai
- Double Happiness
- Hongtashan
