= Double Happiness (cigarette) =

Chinese cigarette brand

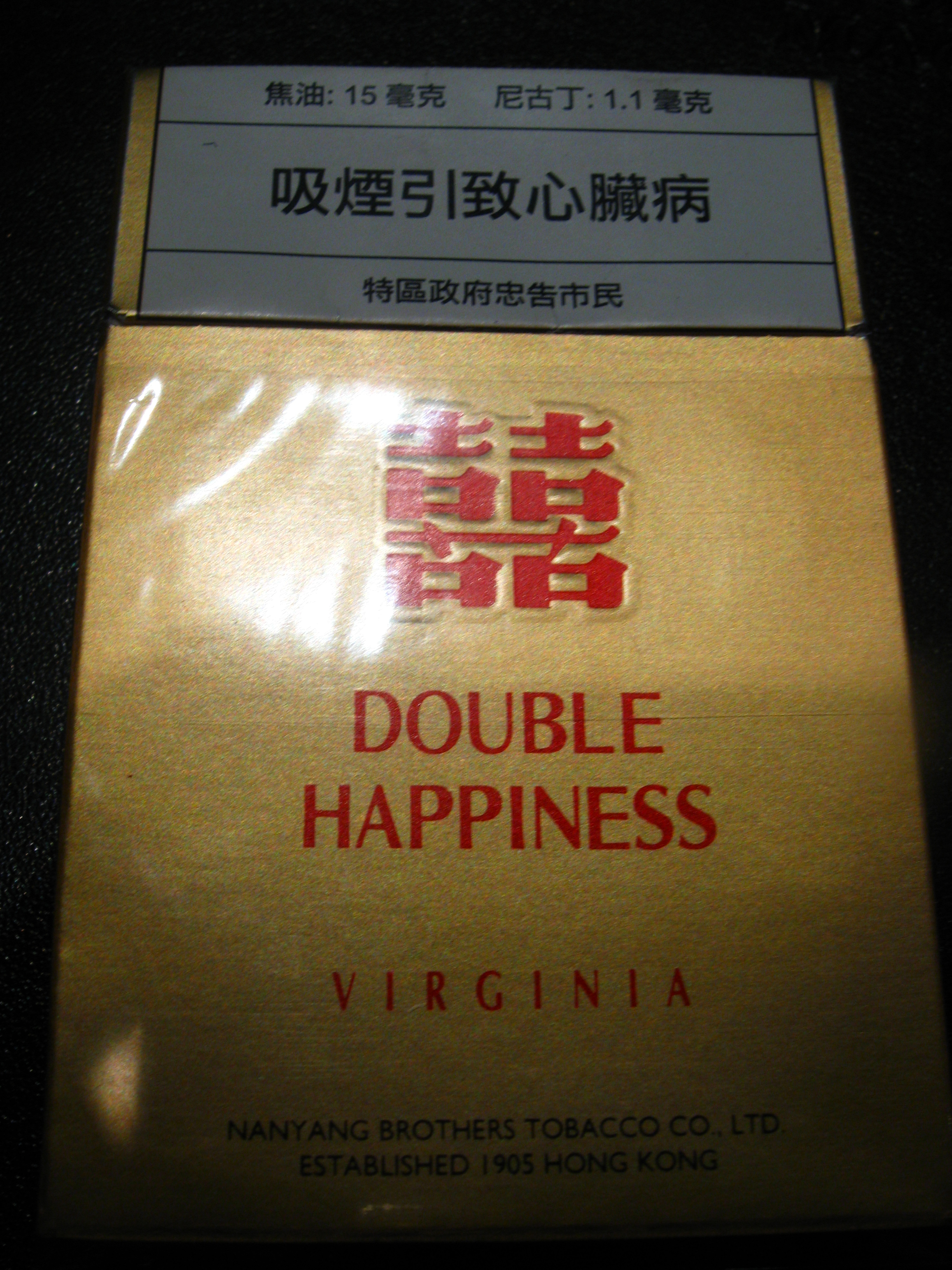
- An old Hong Kong pack of Double Happiness cigarettes with a Hong Kong text warning and nutrition facts
- Product type: Cigarette
- Current owner: Shanghai Tobacco Corporation; CTBAT International Inc; Nanyang Bros Tobacco Company; Sumatra Tobacco Trading Company
- Country: China
- Introduced: 1906; 120 years ago
- Markets: See Markets
- Previous owners: Nanyang Brothers Tobacco Company

Double Happiness (simplified Chinese: 红双喜; traditional Chinese: 紅雙喜; pinyin: Hóngshuāngxǐ) is a Chinese brand of cigarettes, currently owned and manufactured in mainland China by the Shanghai Tobacco Corporation. Outside China, the brand is owned in different countries by Nanyang Brother Tobacco Company, Sumatra Tobacco Trading Company and CTBAT International Ltd (a joint venture between China Tobacco and BAT plc.) It is one of the oldest Chinese cigarette brands currently on the market.

== History ==
Double Happiness was launched in Hong Kong in 1906 by Nanyang Brothers Tobacco Company, and has been one of the most influential cigarette brands in China. In its early days it was known as Happydays in English, but its Chinese name, which means literally "Red Double Happiness", has never changed. After the Chinese Communist Party won the Chinese Civil War and established the People's Republic of China, Nanyang Brothers was nationalized in two stages: first partly in 1951 and then completely in 1959. The "Double Happiness" brand is now owned in mainland China by the state-owned Shanghai Tobacco Corporation.

Outside China, the brand is owned in different countries and territories by Nanyang Brother Tobacco Company, Sumatra Tobacco Trading Company and CTBAT International Ltd. CTBAT is a joint venture between China Tobacco and BAT Plc formed in 2013 that is the owner of the former BAT brand State Express 555 worldwide and of Double Happiness in a number of jurisdictions outside the Mainland of China.

== Double Happiness in China ==
In China the brand with its gold and red packaging is a symbol of tradition, good luck and high status. Because it is culturally iconic and one of the most expensive brands, it is highly popular as a gift during the Lunar New Year and weddings. During the 1980s and 1990s, Double Happiness cigarettes played an unexpected role in Chinese weddings: the bride had to light a cigarette for every man attending the wedding banquet as a token of gratitude. After the 2000s, this custom slowly started to disappear.

The brand is also known to be used as a "social currency" in China. "A person who wanted to buy a bicycle in the early 1980s often had to obtain a ration coupon from his unit, and in such a situation it often made sense to hand the individual responsible for issuing coupons a carton of Double Happiness cigarettes and a couple bottles of erguotou baijiu (white liquor)" wrote Andrew Wedeman, in his book Double Paradox: Rapid Growth and Rising Corruption in China. In 2009, Chinese legislators decided that "tobacco consumption had led to an increase in rampant corruption" and drafted a bill that would make it illegal for government officials to accept cigarettes as gifts. The bill failed to pass.

== Markets ==
Double Happiness cigarettes are mainly sold in China, but also were or are still sold in Hong Kong, Canada, Malaysia, Poland and Russia.

In May 2015, it was reported that Double Happiness is specifically targeted towards the growing numbers of Chinese tourists and diaspora and is sold in more and more duty-free shops around the world.

Double Happiness is also a very common illegal cigarette sold in Australia, and is one of the most commonly sold illegal cigarette brands available on the black market.

== See also ==
- Tobacco smoking
- Chunghwa
