= Simple Symmetric Transport Protocol =

Protocol for delivering messages between clients and servers

Simple Symmetric Transport Protocol (SSTP) is a protocol for delivering messages between clients and servers. It is used by Microsoft Groove.
