= China Daily News (Taiwan) =

Chinese-language newspaper published in Tainan, Taiwan

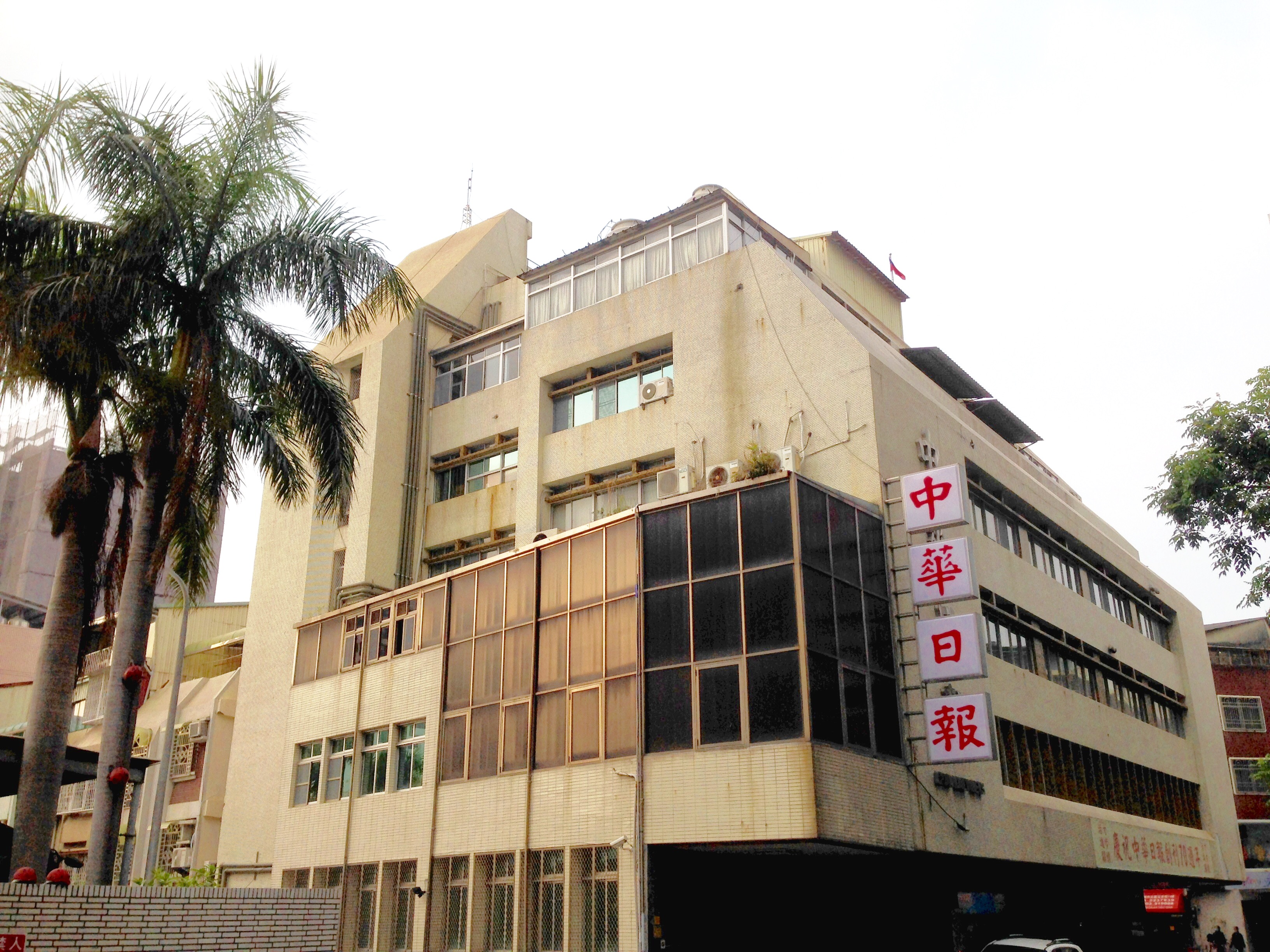
- Headquarters in Tainan
- Native name: 中華日報
- Type: Newspaper
- Founded: 28 March 1946; 80 years ago
- Language: Mandarin Chinese
- Headquarters: Tainan, Taiwan
- Website: cdns.com.tw

China Daily News (Chinese: 中華日報; pinyin: Zhōnghuá Rìbào) is a traditional Chinese-language newspaper published in Tainan, Taiwan. It was established on 20 February 1946 by the Kuomintang and first published on 28 March 1946. The newspaper focuses on the Tainan area. In 1949, a Taipei edition was founded.

== See also ==
- Media of Taiwan
