= International Daily News =

Newspaper

- Type: Daily newspaper
- Format: Broadsheet
- Owner: Java Post Group
- Founder(s): Lee Ya-ping; Chen Tao
- Founded: 1981 in Monterey Park
- Language: Chinese
- Headquarters: Jl. Gunung Sahari XI no. 23, Jakarta, Indonesia
- Circulation: 50,000 (National)
- Website: www.guojiribao.com www.chinesetoday.com

International Daily News (traditional Chinese: 國際日報; simplified Chinese: 国际日报; pinyin: Guójì rìbào), also known as Guoji Ribao, is a major Chinese-language newspaper in North America and Indonesia. It is a pro-mainland newspaper, sold in several major Chinatowns.

The newspaper was founded and owned by Lee Ya-ping (李亚频) and Chen Tao (陈韬) in 1981 in the city of Monterey Park, California. On October 1, 1995, Ted Sioeng, an Indonesian-born entrepreneur, and his family bought the International Daily News, paying between $3 and $4 million for the paper. This purchase was consummated on July 1, 1996.

In contrast to its competitor, the World Journal, the International Daily News appeals to mainland Chinese immigrants in North America due to its much less hostile attitude toward mainland China/Chinese (although in the mid/late-1990s, the World Journal significantly moderated its anti-China line).

Lee Ya-ping, a Chinese American businesswoman and the owner and publisher of International Daily News, was jailed by the Taiwanese government under the Kuomintang regime on 17 September 1985 during a visit to Taiwan, charged with spreading propaganda for the Chinese Communist Party, because she was suspected of publishing articles supporting Beijing's overtures for Chinese unification. Eventually, Lee was released nine days later, under pressure from the United States Congress.

On September 2, 2001, International Daily News and Java Post collaborated to bundle and publish the Wen Wei Po (Southeast Asia Edition), an 8-page daily edition, which was launched simultaneously in Jakarta, Surabaya, Pontianak, and Medan.
