= Shanghai Scientific and Technical Publishers =

Publishing house

Shanghai Scientific and Technical Publishers (Chinese: 上海科学技术出版社) is one of the largest scientific and technical publishing houses in the People's Republic of China. Founded in 1956, it consists of over 20 editing departments, such as science, industry, agriculture, medicine, popular science, scientific education, international, cooperation publishing, audio and video, etc.
