= Shenergy Group =

Chinese state-owned energy company

Shenergy Group Company Limited 申能集团有限公司
- Type: State-owned enterprise
- Industry: Energy investments
- Founded: 1996
- Headquarters: Shanghai, People's Republic of China
- Area served: People's Republic of China
- Key people: Chairman: Qiu Weiguo
- Subsidiaries: Shenergy Company
- Website: www.shenergy.com.cn/

Shenergy Group
- Simplified Chinese: 申能集团有限公司
- Traditional Chinese: 申能集團有限公司
Transcriptions
Standard Mandarin
- Hanyu Pinyin: Shēnnéng Jítuán Yǒuxiàn Gōngsī

Shenergy Group Company Limited is a state-owned enterprise owned by Shanghai government in China. It is the parent company of Shenergy Company Limited, the listed company in the Shanghai Stock Exchange. It is engaged in the investments of electricity, petroleum and natural gas in Shanghai and Eastern China regions.

Its major subsidiary Shenergy Company Limited (SSE: 600642) was reorganized from Shenneng Electric Power Company in 1992. It is engaged in the investments of electricity, petroleum and natural gas. It was listed on the Shanghai Stock Exchange in 1993, and it is the first Chinese electricity energy company listed in Shanghai. It invests in Shanghai Waigaoqiao Electric Power Generating Company Limited and Wujing Thermal Power Plant with Shanghai Electric. It also involves in energy saving and environmental protection.
