= Maoping =

Maoping (茅坪 unless otherwise noted) may refer to the following locations in China:

== Towns ==
- Maoping, Qiandongnan Prefecture, in Jinping County, Guizhou
- Maoping, Meitan County, in Meitan County, Guizhou
- Maoping, Hubei, in Zigui County, Hubei
- Maoping, Chengbu County, in Chengbu Miao Autonomous County, Hunan
- Maoping, Baihe County, in Baihe County, Shaanxi
- Maoping, Yang County, in Yang County, Shaanxi
- Maoping Hui Ethnic Town, in Zhen'an County, Shaanxi
- Maoping, Sichuan (毛坪), in Ebian Yi Autonomous County, Sichuan

== Townships ==
- Maoping Township, Hunan, in Longshan County, Hunan
- Maoping Township, Jiangxi, in Jinggangshan, Jiangxi

== Villages ==
- Maoping Village, in Baixi Town, Xinhua County, Loudi City, Hunan
- Maoping Village, in Fengjia Town, Xinhua County, Loudi City, Hunan
- Maoping Village, in Gantian Town, Zhuzhou County, Zhuzhou City, Hunan
- Maoping Village, in Jiangnan Town, Anhua County, Yiyang, Hunan
- Maoping Village, in Jinshi Town, Lianyuan County, Loudi City, Hunan
- Maoping Village, in Liumutang Town, Lianyuan, Loudi City, Hunan
- Maoping Village, in Pingle Township, Yanling County, Hunan
- Maoping Village, in Pingshui Town, Chaling County, Zhuzhou City, Hunan
- Maoping Village, in Pukou Town, Liling City, Zhuzhou City, Hunan
- Maoping Village, in Yatangpu Township, You County, Zhuzhou City, Hunan
- Maoping Village, in Yichongqiao Township, Cili County, Zhangjiajie, Hunan
- Maoping Village, in Yongfeng Town, Shuangfeng County, Loudi City, Hunan
- Maoping Village, in Zhexi Town, Anhua County, Yiyang, Hunan
- Maoping Village, in Zuoshi Township, Xinhua County, Loudi City, Hunan
