= Youjia =

Youjia 游家镇
- Town
- Location in Hunan
- Coordinates: 27°48′26″N 111°15′54″E
- Country: People's Republic of China
- Province: Hunan
- Prefecture-level city: Loudi
- County: Xinhua County

Area
  - Total: 127.73 km^{2} (49.32 sq mi)

Population
  - Total: 68,900
  - Density: 539/km^{2} (1,400/sq mi)
- Time zone: UTC+8 (China Standard)
- Postal code: 417609
- Area code: 0738

Youjia Town (Chinese: 游家镇; pinyin: Yóujiā Zhèn) is a town of Xinhua County in Hunan, China. The town is located in the central part of the county, it is bordered by Menggong Town and Youxi Township to the north, by Caojia Town to the east, by the subdistrict of Shangmei and Luguan Town to the south, and by Xihe Town to the west. It has an area of 127.73 km^{2} (49.32 sq mi) with a population of 68,900 (as of 2017). The town has 35 villages and a community under its jurisdiction in 2017.

== Administrative divisions ==
In 2017, Youjia Town transferred Huayuan Village (Chinese: 花园村) to Shangmei Subdistrict, three villages to Shangdu Subdistrict, the town has 35 villages and a community under its jurisdiction.

35 villages

- Baota Village (宝塔村)
- Changtian Village (长田村)
- Chuntian Village (春田村)
- Daotian Village (道田村)
- Dongling Village (东岭村)
- Heping Xingcun Village (和平兴村)
- Honghuayuan Village (红花园村)
- Hongxing Village (红星村)
- Hongxingyuan Village (红星园村)
- Huanghailong Village (皇海垅村)
- Huangjialing Village (黄家岭村)
- Huiguang Village (会光村)
- Jianfeng Village (建丰村)
- Jiaxin Village (家新村)
- Jinsheng Village (金盛村)
- Limin Village (利民村)
- Lishan Xincun Village (栗山新村)
- Lixing Village (栗兴村)
- Longtan Village (龙潭村)
- Longxing Village (龙兴村)
- Luguang Village (芦光村)
- Runmin Village (润民村)
- Shibanshan Village (石板山村)
- Tianjia Village (田家村)
- Tongfeng Village (同丰村)
- Tongli Village (同利村)
- Xiejiamiao Village (谢家庙村)
- Xieliangshan Village (歇凉山村)
- Xinjingchong Village (新井冲村)
- Xiyuan Village (西苑村)
- Yong'an Village (永安村)
- Youjia Village (游家村)
- Zhenxing Village (振兴村)
- Zhongxing Village (中兴村)
- Zhujia Village (竹家村)

a community

- Youjiawan Community (游家湾社区)

the following four villages were moved to Shangmei Town,

- Huayuan Village (花园村), moved to Shangmei Subdistrict
- Jinzishan Village (金子山村), moved to Shangdu Subdistrict
- Tishang Village (堤上村), moved to Shangdu Subdistrict
- Xingling Village (兴岭村), moved to Shangdu Subdistrict
