= Caojia, Xinhua =

Caojia 曹家镇
- Town
- Location in Hunan
- Coordinates: 27°49′11″N 111°20′11″E
- Country: People's Republic of China
- Province: Hunan
- Prefecture-level city: Loudi
- County: Xinhua County

Area
  - Total: 120.95 km^{2} (46.70 sq mi)

Population
  - Total: 54,400
  - Density: 450/km^{2} (1,160/sq mi)
- Time zone: UTC+8 (China Standard)
- Postal code: 417619
- Area code: 0738

Caojia Town (Chinese: 曹家镇; pinyin: Cáojiā Zhèn) is a town of Xinhua County in Hunan, China. The town was reformed through the amalgamation of the four townships of Niangjia (娘家乡), Shenli (胜利乡), Xiaoyang (小洋乡) and Shuijiang (水江乡) in 1995.

The town is located in the central east of the county, it is bordered by Jiqing Town and Zuoshi Township to the north, by Sangzi Town to the east, by the subdistrict of Shangdu to the south, and by Youjia Town and Youxi Township to the west. The town has 23 villages under its jurisdiction in 2017.

== Administrative divisions ==
In 2017, Caojia Town transferred a community and six villages to Shangdu Subdistrict, the town has 23 villages under its jurisdiction.

23 villages

- Baixing Village (百兴村)
- Baoyanling Village (白岩岭村)
- Caojia Village (曹家村)
- Chengping Village (城坪村)
- Dakangyuan Village (大康源村)
- Fuping Village (富平村)
- Gaojian Village (高枧村)
- Lishanping Village (栗山坪村)
- Lixin Village (栗新村)
- Lujia Village (卢家村)
- Meihuadong Village (梅花洞村)
- Mushan Xincun Village (木山新村村)
- Shilipu Village (十里铺村)
- Shuangjiang Village (双江村)
- Shuijiang Village (水江村)
- Shuizhu Village (水竹村)
- Siwu Village (思蜈村)
- Xiaoyang Village (小洋村)
- Xuantang Village (漩塘村)
- Yifu Village (益富村)
- Yuxi Village (玉溪村)
- Zaitian Village (在田村)
- Zimuchong Village (梓木冲村)
- Xinyuan Community (新园社区)

the following a community and six villages were moved to Shangmei Town,

- Niangjia Village (娘家村)
- Qingyun Village (青云村)
- Qinjian Village (勤俭村)
- Qinsan Village (勤三村)
- Tianzhu Village (天竺村)
- Zhimushan Village (梽木山村)
