= Ketou Township =

Ketou Township 科头乡
- Township
- Location in Hunan
- Coordinates: 27°40′08″N 111°16′10″E
- Country: People's Republic of China
- Province: Hunan
- Prefecture-level city: Loudi
- County: Xinhua County

Area
  - Total: 67.5 km^{2} (26.1 sq mi)

Population
  - Total: 39,000
  - Density: 580/km^{2} (1,500/sq mi)
- Time zone: UTC+8 (China Standard)
- Postal code: 417699
- Area code: 0738

Ketou Township (Chinese: 科头乡; pinyin: Kētóu Xiāng) is a township of Xinhua County in Hunan, China. The township was created in 1956 and the township of Ruxi (Chinese: 汝溪乡) was merged to it in 1995.

The township is located in the southeast of the county, it is bordered by Shangmei Subdistrict to the north, by Fenglin Subdistrict to the northeast, by the town of Shichongkou and Weishan Township to the southeast, by the two towns of Yangxi and Luguan to the west. It has an area of 65.34 km^{2} (25.23 sq mi) with a population of 43,100 (as of 2017). The town has 19 villages under its jurisdiction in 2017.

== Administrative divisions ==
In 2017, Ketou Township transferred Jiangxi Village (Chinese: 江溪村) to Shangmei Subdistrict. The township has 19 villages under its jurisdiction.

19 villages

- Dalang Village (Chinese: 大浪村)
- Furongzhai Village (Chinese: 芙蓉寨村)
- Huangxi Village (Chinese: 黄西村)
- Huxia Village (Chinese: 湖霞村)
- Ketou Village (Chinese: 科头村)
- Matian Village (Chinese: 马田村)
- Ruxi Village (Chinese: 汝溪村)
- Sanbanqiao Village (Chinese: 三板桥村)
- Shanxia Village (Chinese: 山下村)
- Shizhang Village (Chinese: 石章村)
- Taolin Village (Chinese: 桃林村)
- Xiaolang Village (Chinese: 小浪村)
- Xiazhuang Village (Chinese: 下庄村)
- Xinghuo Village (Chinese: 星火村)
- Yanxia Village (Chinese: 岩下村)
- Youyi Village (Chinese: 友谊村)
- Yuanyi Village (Chinese: 园艺村)
- Zhongxin Village (Chinese: 中心村)
- Zhushan Village (Chinese: 竹山村)

Jiangxi Village

- Jiangxi Village (Chinese: 江溪村) was moved to Shangmei Town, soon transferred to Shangmei Subdistrict in November 2017.
