= Sangzi, Xinhua =

Sangzi Town 桑梓镇
- Town
- Location in Hunan
- Coordinates: 27°40′03″N 111°22′14″E
- Country: People's Republic of China
- Province: Hunan
- Prefecture-level city: Loudi
- County: Xinhua

Area
  - Total: 149.28 km^{2} (57.64 sq mi)

Population
  - Total: 64,700
  - Density: 433/km^{2} (1,120/sq mi)
- Time zone: UTC+8 (China Standard)
- Postal code: 417625
- Area code: 0738

Sangzi Town (Chinese: 桑梓镇; pinyin: Sāngzǐ Zhèn) is a town of Xinhua County in Hunan, China. The town was reformed through the amalgamation of the three townships of Sangzi (桑梓乡), Pingxi (坪溪乡) and Zhegu (柘古乡) in 1995.

The town is located in the east of the county, it is bordered by Zuoshi Township and Tianping Town to the north, by Lengshuijiang City to the east, by the subdistrict of Fenglin and the town of Shichongkou to the south, and by the subdistrict of Shangdu to the west. It has an area of 149.28 km^{2} (57.64 sq mi) with a population of 64,700 (as of 2017). The town has 29 villages and two communities under its jurisdiction in 2017.

== Administrative divisions ==
In 2017, the town of Sangzi transferred Xiangrong Village (向荣村) to Fenglin Subdistrict, the town has 29 villages and two communities under its jurisdiction.

2 communities

- Dashu Community (大树社区)
- Sangshu Community (桑树社区)

29 villages

- Daping Village (大坪村)
- Datian Village (大田村)
- Dazao Village (大皂村)
- Dongsha Village (洞沙村)
- Hongchao Village (洪潮村)
- Huoxing Village (火星村)
- Jiaqiao Village (架桥村)
- Jinqiao Village (金桥村)
- Jiyun Village (集云村)
- Jizhong Village (集中村)
- Juxing Village (聚星村)
- Lixiqiao Village (栗溪桥村)
- Manshanjian Village (尖山涧村)
- Manshentang Village (满圣塘村)
- Manzhu Village (满竹村)
- Pingxi Village (坪溪村)
- Pingyan Village (坪烟村)
- Qingfeng Village (青峰村)
- Qingshan Village (青山村)
- Shatian Village (沙田村)
- Shijiao Village (石窖村)
- Songjiaqiao Village (宋家桥村)
- Tangchong Village (塘冲村)
- Tianzhuang Village (田庄村)
- Xijiangwan Village (西江湾村)
- Xinxing Village (新兴村)
- Yunyu Village (云玉村)
- Zengjia Village (曾家村)
- Zhemu Village (柘木村)

Xiangrong Village

- Xiangrong Village (向荣村) was moved to Shangmei Town, soon transferred to Fenglin Subdistrict in November 2017.
