= Shangmei =

Shangmei (上梅) may refer to:

- Shangmei, Hunan, a general term for the urban area of Xinhua County in Hunan. it ceased to be a separate town in 2017.
- Shangmei Subdistrict, a subdistrict of Xinhua County formed in 2017.
- Shangmei Township, a township in Wuyishan, Fujian, China
