= Shangmei, Hunan =

Shangmei Town 上梅镇
- Town
- Location in Hunan
- Coordinates: 27°44′46″N 111°17′55″E
- Country: People's Republic of China
- Province: Hunan
- Prefecture-level city: Loudi
- County: Xinhua

Area
  - Total: 92.7 km^{2} (35.8 sq mi)

Population
  - Total: 12.2
  - Density: 0.132/km^{2} (0.341/sq mi)
- Time zone: UTC+8 (China Standard)
- Postal code: 417699
- Area code: 0738

Shangmei Town (Chinese: 上梅镇; pinyin: Shàngméi Zhèn) was a historic town and the former seat of Xinhua County in Hunan, China. The town was reformed through the amalgamation of Liaoyuan Township (燎原乡), Beidu Township (北渡乡), Fenglin Township (枫林乡) and Chengguan Town in 1995.

The town was located in the south east of the county, it was bordered by the towns of Caojia and Youjia to the north, by Sangzi Town to the east, by the town of Shichongkou to the south, and by Ketou Township and Luguan Town to the west. In 2017, additional 12 villages and a community from the towns of Caojia, Youjia and Sangzi and Ketou Township were transferred to it, it had an area of 145.63 km^{2} (56.23 sq mi) with a population of 189,600 (as of 2017). The town had 29 villages and 23 communities under its jurisdiction in 2017, its seat was at Yingbin Road (迎宾路). It ceased to be a separate town on November 6, 2017, the town and Shangdu Office (上渡办事处) were divided into three subdistricts of Shangmei, Shangdu and Fenglin.

== Administrative divisions ==
In 2017, the town of Shangmei had 29 villages and 23 communities under its jurisdiction.

23 communities

- Beita Community (北塔社区)
- Chongyangling Community (崇阳岭社区)
- Dongwai Community (东外社区)
- Fujingshan Community (福景山社区)
- Gongnong Community (工农社区)
- Gongnonghe Community (工农河社区)
- Huaxin Community (华新社区)
- Huochezhan Community (火车站社区)
- Liaoyuan Community (燎原社区)
- Lixinqiao Community (立新桥社区)
- Ma'anshan Community (马鞍山社区)
- Meishu Community (梅树社区)
- Paomaling Community (跑马岭社区)
- Pingshanlong Community (坪山垅社区)
- Qingshijie Community (青石街社区)
- Shangtian Community (上田社区)
- Shizijie Community (十字街社区)
- Wuliting Community (五里亭社区)
- Xintian Community (新田社区)
- Yongxing Community (永兴社区)
- Yuanzhuling Community (园株岭社区)
- Yuxugong Community (玉虚宫社区)
- Xinyuan Community (新园社区) merging from Caojia in 2017

29 villages

- Beidu Village (北渡村)
- Dashuiping Village (大水坪村)
- Fengshuxincun Village (枫林新村)
- Hexing Village (和兴村)
- Hongda Village (洪大村)
- Hongqixincun Village (红旗新村)
- Hongxing Village (鸿兴村)
- Huanglong Village (黄龙村)
- Huashan Village (花山村)
- Jielong Village (接龙村)
- Jizhong Village (集中村)
- Maojialong Village (毛家垅村)
- Wanjiaqiao Village (万家桥村)
- Xiatian Village (下田村)
- Xindu Village (新渡村)
- Xingyue Village (星月村)
- Xintang Village (新塘村)
- Huayuan Village (花园村) merging from Youjia in 2017
- Jiangxi Village (江溪村) merging from Ketou in 2017
- Jinzishan Village (金子山村) merging from Youjia in 2017
- Niangjia Village (娘家村) merging from Caojia in 2017
- Qingyun Village (青云村) merging from Caojia in 2017
- Qinjian Village (勤俭村) merging from Caojia in 2017
- Qinsan Village (勤三村) merging from Caojia in 2017
- Tianzhu Village (天竺村) merging from Caojia in 2017
- Tishang Village (堤上村) merging from Youjia in 2017
- Xiangrong Village (向荣村) merging from Sangzi in 2017
- Xingling Village (兴岭村) merging from Youjia in 2017
- Zhimushan Village (梽木山村) merging from Caojia in 2017
