= Dongping (disambiguation) =

Dongping may refer to the following in China:

- Dongping County (东平县), Tai'an, Shandong
- Dongping Lake, in the eponymous county
- Dongping National Forest Park (东平国家森林公园), in Chongming Island, Shanghai

Towns

Written as "东平镇":

- Dongping, Yongchun County, Fujian
- Dongping, Zhenghe County, Fujian
- Dongping, Yangdong County, Guangdong
- Dongping, Bobai County, in Bobai County, Guangxi
- Dongping, Dongping County, Shandong
- Dongping, Chongming County, Shanghai

Written as "东坪镇":

- Dongping, Ruyuan County, in Ruyuan Yao Autonomous County, Guangdong
- Dongping, Anhua County, in Anhua County, Hunan
- Dongping, Zibo, in Zichuan District, Zibo, Shandong

Written as "东屏镇":

- Dongping, Lishui County, Jiangsu
- Dongping, Zhenlai County, Jilin
- Dongping, Dongtou County, Zhejiang

Townships (东坪乡)

- Dongping Township, Tenzhu County, in Tenzhu Tibetan Autonomous County, Gansu
- Dongping Township, Qiaojia County, in Qiaojia County, Yunnan

Subdistrict (东坪街道)

- Dongping, Xiangtan (东坪街道), a subdistrict of Yuetang District in Xiangtan City, Hunan Province.
