= Ketou (disambiguation) =

Ketou may refer to:

- Kétou, Benin, Yoruba town, arrondissement, and commune located in the Plateau Department of the Republic of Benin
- Ketu (Benin), historical region of what is now the Republic of Benin
- Ketou Township, a township of Xinhua County, Hunan, China
- "Ketou" or kowtow, the Chinese act of respect shown by kneeling and bowing
