= Fengjia =

Fengjia may refer to:

- Fengjia Subdistrict (冯家街道), a subdistrict in Qianjiang District, Chongqing, China
- Fengjia Night Market (逢甲夜市), a night market in Xitun District, Taichung, Taiwan

== Towns ==
- Fengjia, Hunan (奉家), in Xinhua County, Hunan, China
- Fengjia, Liaoning (冯家), in Zhangwu County, Liaoning, China
- Fengjia, Binzhou (冯家), in Zhanhua District, Binzhou, Shandong, China
- Fengjia, Rushan (冯家), in Rushan, Shandong, China

== See also ==
- Feng Chia University, a university in Xitun District, Taichung, Taiwan
- Pengjia islet
