= Meicheng =

Meicheng may refer to the following towns in China: 梅城：

- Meicheng, Anhui in Qianshan County, Anhui
- Meicheng, Fujian in Minqing County, Fujian
- Meicheng, Hunan in Anhua County, Hunan
- Meicheng, Zhejiang in Jiande, Zhejiang

玫城：

- Alias of Pingyin County
