= Shuiche =

Shuiche may refer to:

- Shuiche, Hunan, a town in Xinhua County, Hunan, China
- Shuiche, Guangdong, a town in Meixian, Meizhou, Guangdong, China
- Shuiche Township, a township-level division of Guangxi, China
