= Qujiang, Anhua =

Qujiang Town 渠江镇
- Town
- Location in Hunan
- Coordinates: 28°04′31″N 110°57′03″E
- Country: People's Republic of China
- Province: Hunan
- Prefecture-level city: Yiyang
- County: Anhua

Area
  - Total: 86.23 km^{2} (33.29 sq mi)

Population
  - Total: 13,600
  - Density: 158/km^{2} (408/sq mi)
- Time zone: UTC+8 (China Standard)
- Area code: 0737

Qujiang Town (simplified Chinese: 渠江镇; traditional Chinese: 渠江鎮; pinyin: Qújiāng Zhèn) is an urban town in Anhua County, Hunan Province, People's Republic of China.

== Administrative divisions ==
The town is divided into 11 villages and 1 community, which include the following areas: Qujiang Community, Fuxi Village, Datang Village, Yanjia Village, Chengping Village, Dacang Village, Taoping Village, Yuanda Village, Lianli Village, Da'an Village, Shengjia Village, and Lianhua Village (渠江社区、敷溪村、大塘村、晏家村、城坪村、大仓村、桃坪村、沅大村、连里村、大安村、升家村、连华村).

== Geography ==
Anhua County, the third-largest county in Hunan Province, has a mountainous area covering 82% of its territory. The county's main rivers are also important water resources. Tea transportation infrastructure consists primarily of land and water transport facilities and associated services, including roads, rivers, bridges, wharves, ferries, storage facilities, passes, post stations, vehicles, natural and artificial landmarks, and physical geographical features.

The county is also susceptible to rainfall-induced landslides due to its geological formations, heavy and persistent rainfall, steep slopes, and frequent slope instability. The occurrence of landslides poses risks to local residents and tourists. Although previous national studies have examined landslide susceptibility in Anhua County, accurate and reliable landslide susceptibility maps for the region remain limited. This study introduces a stacking ensemble method that integrates statistical and machine learning techniques to assess landslide susceptibility. It aims to produce landslide susceptibility maps for Anhua County using random forest (RF), extreme gradient boosting (XGB), and stacking models combining support vector classification (SVC) with RF, gradient boosting decision tree (GBDT), and XGB (RF+SVC, GBDT+SVC, and XGB+SVC). The study also compares the performance of the three approaches (RF, XGB, and stacking with SVC) in assessing landslide susceptibility.

Anhua has extensive forest resources, including pine, fir, bamboo, tea, and medicinal herbs. Its mineral resources include tungsten, gold, antimony, vanadium, and manganese, with 39 types of mineral deposits discovered. The county also has hydropower resources, with a theoretical hydropower potential of 1.5 million kilowatts and an installed capacity of 1.25 million kilowatts. In addition to the Zhexi, Dongping and Zhuxikou hydropower stations, 53 small hydropower stations have been built, with a combined installed capacity exceeding 40,000 kilowatts.

Anhua has several scenic areas and historical sites. These include the provincial-level Zhexi Forest Park, which contains extensive forest areas, and the provincial-level Xuefeng Lake Geopark, which features what has been described as the world's first glacial till. Historical sites include well-preserved Confucian and Martial Temples, and the Tao Shu Mausoleum, which contains stone figures, stone horses, tomb halls, and imperial inscriptions.

== Climate ==
Anhua is located in the East Asian monsoon region and has a humid subtropical monsoon climate. It is characterized by mild temperatures, distinct seasons, abundant heat, concentrated rainfall, variable spring temperatures, frequent droughts in summer and autumn, a short period of severe cold, and a prolonged period of hot weather. The average annual temperature is 16.2 °C, with January being the coldest month and July the warmest. The average frost-free period is approximately 275 days, and annual sunshine duration averages 1,300 hours. Average annual precipitation is approximately 1,700 mm, with 60% of rainfall occurring between April and July.

== Economy ==
In 2011, Qujiang Town's total fiscal revenue was 4.429 million yuan, an increase of 38.7% from the previous year. Local fiscal revenue amounted to 3.5 million yuan, an increase of 32.5%. Business tax revenue reached 2.83 million yuan, an increase of 27.1%; value-added tax revenue was 343,000 yuan, an increase of 12.4%; corporate income tax revenue was 10,000 yuan, an increase of 10.7%; and personal income tax revenue was 110,000 yuan, an increase of 32.5%. Per capita fiscal revenue was 309.8 yuan, an increase of 15.8% from the previous year. Fiscal expenditure in 2011 amounted to 4.425 million yuan. The per capita net income of farmers was 2,738 yuan.

In 2019, Qujiang Town had three industrial enterprises, one of which was classified as being above the designated size. It also had 36 general stores or supermarkets with business areas exceeding 50 square metres.

Anhua County has also developed a rural e-commerce network, establishing 23 township-level e-commerce service centers and 410 village-level service centers and stations to support the online sale of agricultural products. The county has also established strategic partnerships with JD.com, Alibaba and ByteDance to expand online marketing and logistics services; by November 2023, its online sales had reached 513 million yuan, an increase of 36% year on year.
