= Longtang (disambiguation) =

Longtang is a traditional type of urban alley-community in Shanghai.

Longtang may also refer to:

- Longtang, Hainan, China
- Longtang, Lianyuan, Loudi City, Hunan Province, China
- Longtang, Anhua, Yiyang, Hunan Province, China
- Longtang, Leiyang (龙塘镇), a town of Leiyang City, Hunan.
