= Changtang (disambiguation) =

The Changtang is part of the Tibetan Plateau in western and northern Tibet and extending into India.

Changtang may also refer to:

== Towns or townships in China ==
- Changtang, Anhua (长塘镇), a town of Anhua County, Hunan
- Changtang, Linxiang (长塘镇), a town of Linxiang City, Hunan
- Changtang, Dongkou (长塘瑶族乡), a Yao ethnic township of Dongkou County, Hunan

== Other uses ==
- Chang Tang Nature Reserve (羌塘国家级自然保护区), a nature reserve in the northern Tibetan Plateau of China
