= Xianxi =

Xianxi may refer to the following places:

== China ==
- Xianxi, Anhua (仙溪镇), a town in Anhua County, Yiyang, Hunan
- Xianxi Campus, a campus of Foshan University in Foshan, Guangdong
- Xi'anxi railway station, or Xi'an West railway station in Xi'an, Shaanxi
- Xianxi, Tongdao (县溪镇), a town of Tongdao Dong Autonomous County, Hunan.
- Xianxi, Yueqing (仙溪镇), a town in Yueqing, Wenzhou, Zhejiang

== Taiwan ==
- Xianxi, Changhua (線西鄉), township in Changhua County
