= Zhexi Reservoir =

Hunan, China lake

- 柘溪水库 (Chinese)
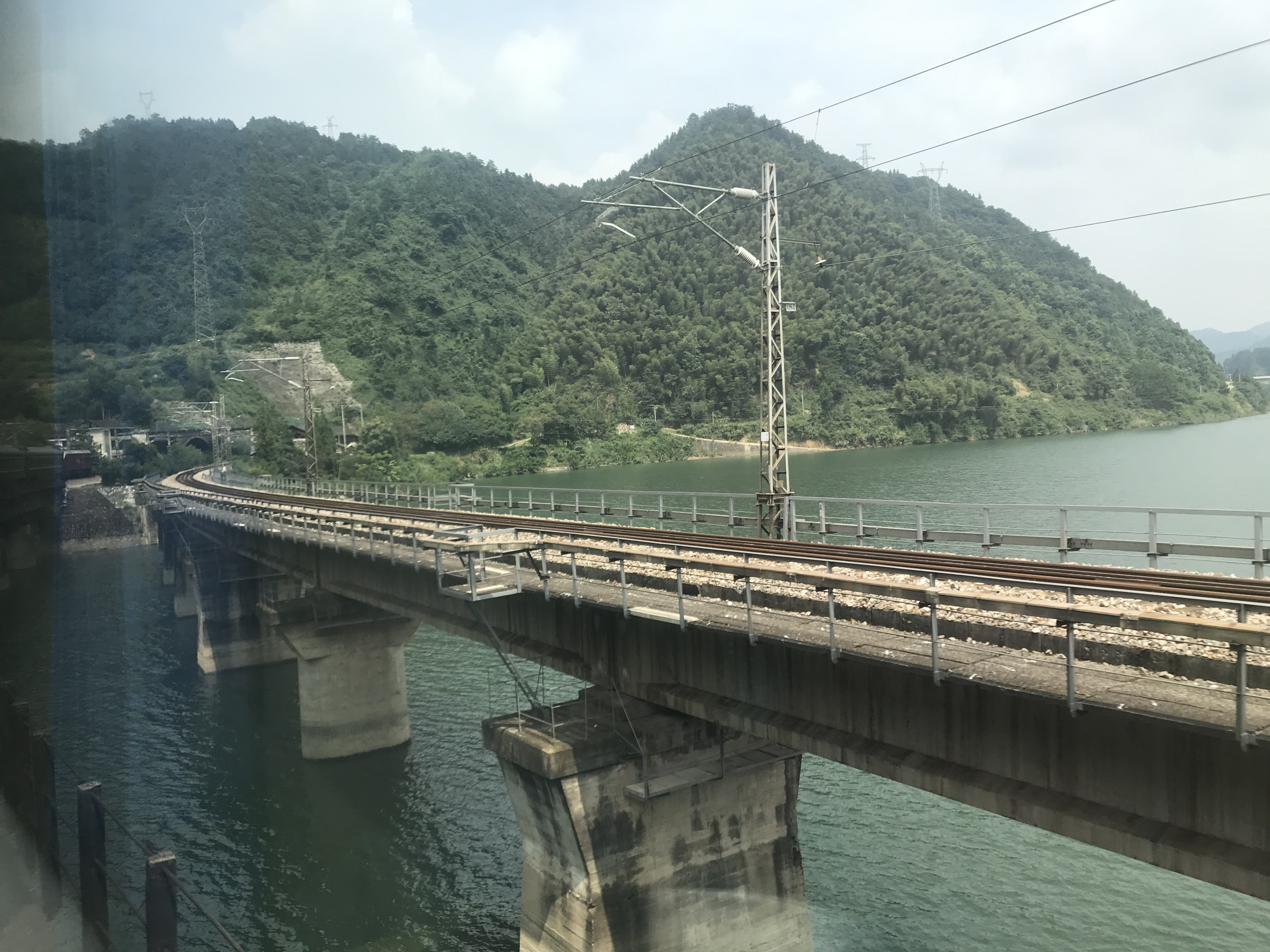
- Shanghai–Kunming railway passes across the Zhexi Reservoir in August 2019

- Location in Hunan
- Location: Anhua County, Hunan, China
- Coordinates: 28°19′44″N 117°07′40″E
- Type: Reservoir
- Primary inflows: Zi River
- Primary outflows: Zi River
- Basin countries: China
- Built: 1962
- First flooded: 1962
- Surface area: 22,640 square kilometres (5,590,000 acres)
- Max. depth: 169.5 m (556 ft)
- Water volume: 3,020,000,000 m^{3} (0.72 cu mi)

Zhexi Reservoir (simplified Chinese: 柘溪水库; traditional Chinese: 柘溪水庫; pinyin: Zhèxī Shuǐkù) is a reservoir in Anhua County, Hunan, China. It covers a total surface area of 22,640 km^{2} (8,740 sq mi) and has a storage capacity of some 3,020,000,000 m^{3} (1.07×10^{11} cu ft) of water.

== Dam ==
The Zhexi Dam was built at the outlet of the reservoir. It was built from June 1958 to 1962, and the first generator was operational on 28 January 1962.

== Public Access ==
Zhexi Reservoir open to visitors for free. It is a popular recreation area for fishing and tourism.
