= Yanxi =

Yanxi may refer to:

== Locations in China ==
Fujian

- Yanxi, Changtai County (岩溪), a town in Changtai County
- Yanxi Subdistrict (燕西街道), a subdistrict in Yong'an

Hunan

- Yanxi, Anhua County (烟溪), a town in Anhua County
- Yanxi, Liuyang (沿溪), a town in Liuyang
- Yanxi Township, Hunan (沿溪乡), a township in Xupu County

Jiangxi

- Yanxi, Taihe County (沿溪), a town in Taihe County, Jiangxi
- Yanxi, Xiajiang County (砚溪), a town in Xiajiang County

Other provinces

- Yanxi, Chongqing (沿溪), a town in Shizhu Tujia Autonomous County, Chongqing
- Yanxi Township, Sichuan (烟溪乡), a township in Tongjiang County, Sichuan

== Historical eras ==
- Yanxi (延熹, 158–167), era name by Emperor Huan of Han
- Yanxi (延熙, 238–257), era name by Liu Shan, emperor of Shu Han
- Yanxi (延熙, 334), era name by Shi Hong, emperor of Later Zhao
