= Malu, Anhua =

Malu Town 马路镇
- Town
- Location in Hunan
- Coordinates: 28°22′07″N 111°01′43″E
- Country: People's Republic of China
- Province: Hunan
- Prefecture-level city: Yiyang
- County: Anhua

Area
  - Total: 408 km^{2} (158 sq mi)

Population
  - Total: 44,600
  - Density: 109/km^{2} (283/sq mi)
- Time zone: UTC+8 (China Standard)
- Area code: 0737

Malu Town (simplified Chinese: 马路镇; traditional Chinese: 馬路鎮; pinyin: Mǎlù Zhèn) is an urban town in Anhua County, Hunan Province, People's Republic of China.

== Administrative divisions ==
The town is divided into 35 villages and one community:

Malu Community (马路社区)	Dongshan Village (马路社)	Mahuang Village (马隍村)	Huangpo Village (黄婆村)
Yanjiazhuang Village (严家庄村)	Xiaoxi Village (小溪村)	Sifang Village (四房村)	Chanxikou Village (潺溪口村)
Chanping Village (潺坪村)	Yuntaishan Village (云台山村)	Yuexi Village (岳溪村)	Chengping Village (澄坪村)
Maluxi Village (马路溪村)	Qingyun Village (青云村)	Huangjin Village (黄金村)	Dawang Village (大旺村)
Tian'e Village (天鹅村)	Majishi Village (马辔市村)	Longqi Village (龙栖村)	Guanpinghemu Village (管坪和睦村)
Sanmen Village (三门村)	Malu Village (马路村)	Bajiao Village (八角村)	Cangchang Village (苍场村)
Zhe'er Village (折尔村)	Kushan Village (苦山村)	Jiangxi Village (江溪村)	Youyi Village (友谊村)
Zhayang Village (渣洋村)	Liubu Village (六步村)	Wangxi Village (网溪村)	Jiangping Village (蒋坪村)
Qixiandong Village (七仙洞村)	Bidan Village (碧丹村)	Hunanpo Village (湖南坡村)	Xiejiaxi Village (谢家溪村)
