= Tianzhuang, Anhua =

Tianzhuang Township 田庄乡
- Township
- Location in Hunan
- Coordinates: 28°19′12″N 111°17′19″E
- Country: People's Republic of China
- Province: Hunan
- Prefecture-level city: Yiyang
- County: Anhua

Area
  - Total: 207.7 km^{2} (80.2 sq mi)

Population
  - Total: 32,000
  - Density: 150/km^{2} (400/sq mi)
- Time zone: UTC+8 (China Standard)
- Area code: 0737

Tianzhuang Township (simplified Chinese: 田庄乡; traditional Chinese: 田莊鄉; pinyin: Tiánzhuāng Xiāng) is a rural township in Anhua County, Hunan Province, People's Republic of China.

== Administrative divisions ==
The township is divided into 23 villages, which include the following areas: Xinlian Village, Tianzhuang Village, Longmen Village, Guanxi'ao Village, Queping Village, Chajia Village, Jinzhu Village, Zhuping Village, Yonghe Village, Longtang Village, Wenxi Village, Baisha Village, Youma Village, Baizhushui Village, Wenxi Village, Maoyuan Village, Taolin Village, Gongfu Village, Tianhuang Village, Gaoma'erxi Village, Xiangyan Village, Jinsha Village, and Shuangwen Village (新联村、田庄村、龙门村、官溪坳村、鹊坪村、茶加村、金竹村、竹坪村、永和村、陇塘村、文溪村、白沙村、尤马村、白竹水村、温溪村、茅园村、桃林村、共富村、田黄村、高马二溪村、湘岩村、金沙村、双文村).
