= Dafu, Anhua =

Dafu Town 大福镇
- Town
- Location in Hunan
- Coordinates: 28°18′36″N 111°53′23″E
- Country: People's Republic of China
- Province: Hunan
- Prefecture-level city: Yiyang
- County: Anhua County

Area
  - Total: 320 km^{2} (120 sq mi)

Population
  - Total: 50,000
  - Density: 160/km^{2} (400/sq mi)
- Time zone: UTC+8 (China Standard)
- Area code: 0737

Dafu Town (simplified Chinese: 大福镇; traditional Chinese: 大福鎮; pinyin: Dàfú Zhèn) is an urban town in Anhua County, Hunan Province, People's Republic of China.

== Administrative divisions ==
The town is divided into 48 villages and 3 communities, which include the following areas: Xinbin Community, Heping Community, Yongjiu Community, Dafuping Village, Zhangwu Village, Shimen Village, Hehuang Village, Fulixi Village, Mengjia Village, Xiaoyao Village, Dayao Village, Xinsi Village, Zhemu Village, Wenqing Village, Dongshan Village, Xinqiao Village, Baini Village, Huangpi Village, Guancang Village, Xichong Village, Ximazhuang Village, Jianhe Village, Shigao Village, Dongyang Village, Zhongxin Village, Liuyan Village, Xin'an Village, Yinshi Village, Dachang Village, Meixi Village, Xinmei Village, Fengquan Village, Jiangfu Village, Jinshu Village, Longrong Village, Mukong Village, Fumin Village, Yunwu Village, Beixing Village, Jianlu Village, Yinxin Village, Muxi Village, Hemu Village, Jinji Village, Cangxiang Village, Tianzhao Village, Fuxin Village, Minfu Village, Wenli Village, Youyi Village, and Jiaorong Village, (沂滨社区、和平社区、永久社区、大福坪村、张吴村、石门村、禾黄村、浮栗溪村、孟家村、小尧村、大尧村、新寺村、柘木村、文青村、东山村、新桥村、白泥村、黄皮村、官仓村、西冲村、西马庄村、建和村、石膏村、东阳村、中心村、柳严村、新安村、印石村、大长村、梅溪村、新梅村、凤泉村、江福村、金树村、龙荣村、木孔村、富民村、云雾村、北兴村、建炉村、尹新村、木溪村、合木村、金鸡村、苍湘村、天罩村、福欣村、民富村、文利村、友谊村、焦容村).
