= Le'an, Anhua =

Le'an Town 乐安镇
- Town
- Location in Hunan
- Coordinates: 28°06′28″N 111°34′36″E
- Country: People's Republic of China
- Province: Hunan
- Prefecture-level city: Yiyang
- County: Anhua County

Area
  - Total: 191.9 km^{2} (74.1 sq mi)

Population
  - Total: 48,000
  - Density: 250/km^{2} (650/sq mi)
- Time zone: UTC+8 (China Standard)
- Area code: 0737

Le'an Town (simplified Chinese: 乐安镇; traditional Chinese: 樂安鎮; pinyin: Lè'ān Zhèn) is an urban town in Anhua County, Yiyang, Hunan Province, People's Republic of China.

== Administrative divisions ==
The town is divided into 28 villages and 2 communities, which include the following areas: Legao Community, Leqiao Community, Lexing Village, Lequn Village, Yishui Village, Tuan'an Village, Tuanyun Village, Gutang Village, Qingyun Village, Zhufeng Village, Youxi Village, Guanxi Village, Guanjia Village, Kuaima Village, Changzhao Village, Putao Village, Qingfeng Village, Yanjing Village, Chiyou Village, Kuanglin Village, Shuixi Village, Xiangma Village, Gurong Village, Changle Village, Yu'an Village, Wenshi Village, Hengshi Village, Yizhong Village, and Xiong'er Village (乐高社区、乐桥社区、乐兴村、乐群村、伊水村、团安村、团云村、团红村、古塘村、青云村、祝丰村、尤溪村、官溪村、官加村、快马村、长赵村、葡萄村、青峰村、盐井村、蚩尤村、匡林村、水溪村、香马村、古溶村、长乐村、余安村、文石村、横市村、伊中村、熊耳村).
