= Darongxi =

Town in the Hunan province of China

Coordinates: 29°08′N 110°25′E

Darongxi (Chinese: 大溶溪) is a small village in Zhexi, Anhua, Hunan province, China.
