= Lengshi, Anhua =

Lengshi Town 冷市镇
- Town
- Location in Hunan
- Coordinates: 28°30′46″N 111°31′21″E
- Country: People's Republic of China
- Province: Hunan
- Prefecture-level city: Yiyang
- County: Anhua County

Area
  - Total: 183.04 km^{2} (70.67 sq mi)

Population
  - Total: 38,900
  - Density: 213/km^{2} (550/sq mi)
- Time zone: UTC+8 (China Standard)
- Area code: 0737

Lengshi Town (simplified Chinese: 冷市镇; traditional Chinese: 冷市鎮; pinyin: Lěngshì Zhèn) is an urban town in Anhua County, Hunan Province, People's Republic of China.

== Administrative divisions ==
The town is divided into 20 villages and 2 communities, which include the following areas: Qujiang Community, Lengjiazui Community, Nanhua Village, Wenchang Village, Sanzhou Village, Maqiao Village, Daqiaoshui Village, Dongjia Village, Liangjia Village, Hujia Village, Taozhu Village, Heqiu Village, Dongzhuangping Village, Baiyuxi Village, Xinjiu Village, Jiaxing Village, Jinhu Village, Gaoqiao Village, Jinyang Village, Shijia Village, Dacang Village, and Pali Village (曲江社区、冷家嘴社区、南华村、文昌村、三洲村、马桥村、大桥水村、董家村、梁家村、胡家村、陶竹村、河丘村、东庄坪村、白玉溪村、新九村、家兴村、金湖村、高桥村、金阳村、石家村、大苍村、琶栗村).
