= Pingkou, Anhua =

Pingkou Town 平口镇
- Town
- Location in Hunan
- Coordinates: 28°02′25″N 111°05′51″E
- Country: People's Republic of China
- Province: Hunan
- Prefecture-level city: Yiyang
- County: Anhua

Area
  - Total: 106.5 km^{2} (41.1 sq mi)

Population
  - Total: 25,000
  - Density: 230/km^{2} (610/sq mi)
- Time zone: UTC+8 (China Standard)
- Area code: 0737

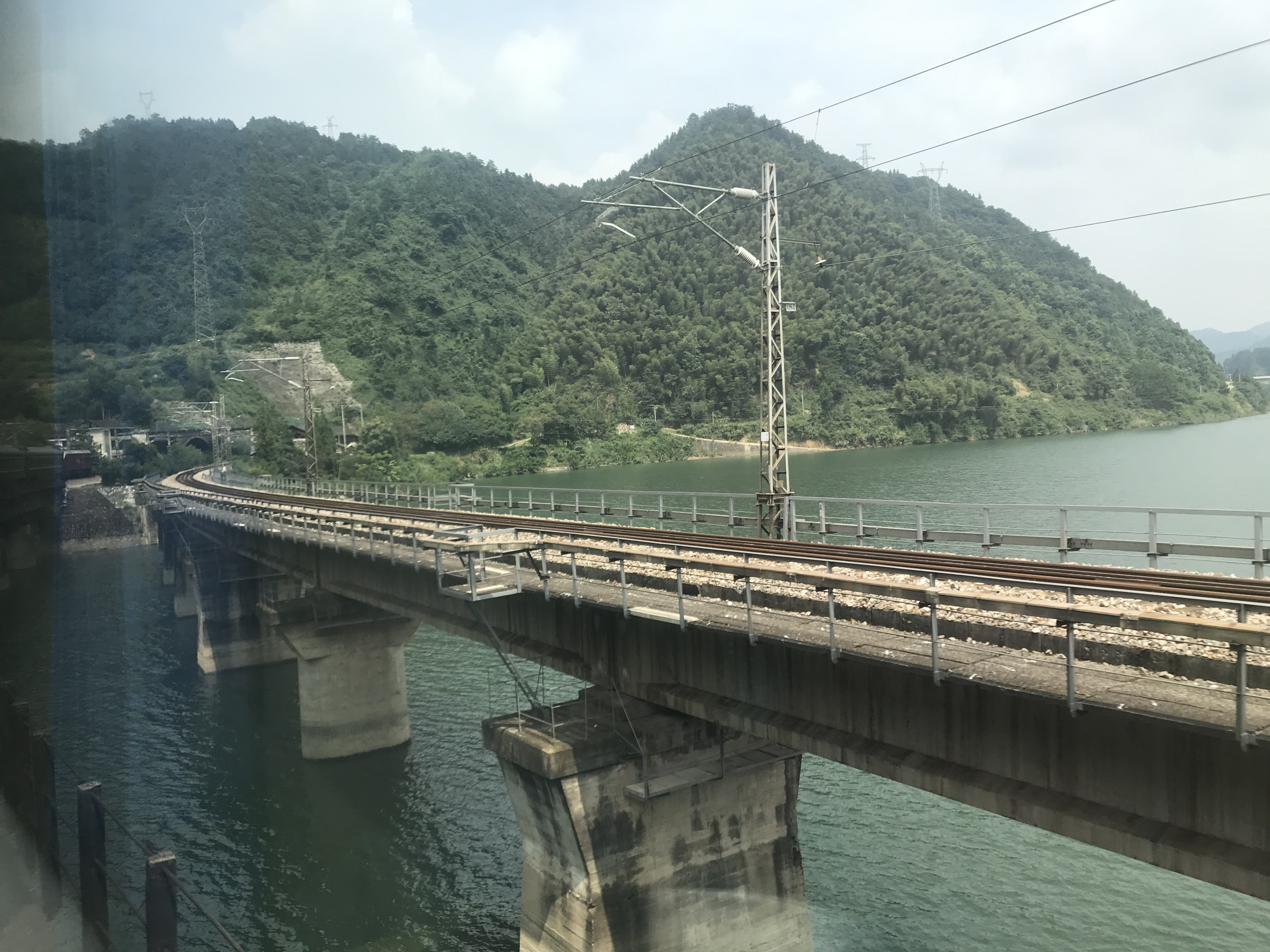

Pingkou Town (simplified Chinese: 平口镇; traditional Chinese: 平口鎮; pinyin: Píngkǒu Zhèn) is an urban town in Anhua County, Hunan Province, People's Republic of China.

== Administrative divisions ==
The town is divided into 11 villages and 3 communities, which include the following areas: Xinzheng Community, Jianping Community, Yongxing Community, Fanxi Village, Huayuan Village, Yongjia Village, Pingshan Village, Shanyang Village, Shangsheng Village, Xinxi Village, Jinhui Village, Hongzhu Village, Xinping Village, and Xingguo Village (新正社区、建平社区、永兴社区、范溪村、花园村、漾佳村、平山村、山洋村、上升村、沂溪村、金辉村、洪竹村、新坪村、兴果村).
