= Weishan, Xinhua =

Weishan Township 维山乡
- Township
- Location in Hunan
- Coordinates: 27°37′10″N 111°17′25″E
- Country: People's Republic of China
- Province: Hunan
- Prefecture-level city: Loudi
- County: Xinhua County

Area
  - Total: 85.25 km^{2} (32.92 sq mi)
- Elevation: 309 m (1,014 ft)

Population
  - Total: 39,000
  - Density: 460/km^{2} (1,200/sq mi)
- Time zone: UTC+8 (China Standard)
- Postal code: 417626
- Area code: 0738

Weishan Township (simplified Chinese: 维山乡; traditional Chinese: 維山鄉; pinyin: Weishan Xiang) is a rural township in Xinhua County, Hunan Province, People's Republic of China.

== Administrative divisions ==
The township is divided into 28 villages, which include the following areas: Pengjia Village, Lujiaqiao Village, Shanmu Village, Linwu Village, Weishan Village, Shuikou Village, Yuanyichang Village, Shuangjing Village, Juhua Village, Mofeng Village, Hengxilong Village, Shiwu Village, Bishui Village, Guanzhuang Village, Chentian Village, Longping Village, Longzhai Village, Sidu Village, Qingshu Village, Sanfeng Village, Huanggu Village, Chayuan Village, Sanlian Village, Dongli Village, Chashanchong Village, Shimenzhai Village, Bizhou Village, Cangfeng Village (彭家村、芦家桥村、杉木村、林屋村、维山村、水口村、园艺场村、双井村、菊花村、磨峰村、横溪垅村、石屋村、碧水村、官庄村、陈田村、龙坪村、龙寨村、四都村、青树村、三丰村、黄古村、茶元村、三联村、洞里村、茶山冲村、石门寨村、碧洲村、苍峰村).
