= Kuixi, Anhua =

Kuixi Town 奎溪镇
- Town
- Location in Hunan
- Coordinates: 28°14′58″N 110°50′07″E
- Country: People's Republic of China
- Province: Hunan
- Prefecture-level city: Yiyang
- County: Anhua County

Area
  - Total: 242.24 km^{2} (93.53 sq mi)

Population
  - Total: 23,600
  - Density: 97.4/km^{2} (252/sq mi)
- Time zone: UTC+8 (China Standard)
- Area code: 0737

Kuixi Town (simplified Chinese: 奎溪镇; traditional Chinese: 奎溪鎮; pinyin: Kuíxī Zhèn) is an urban town in Anhua County, Hunan Province, People's Republic of China.

== Administrative divisions ==
The town is divided into 12 villages and 1 community, which include the following areas: Baiyang Community, Yongxing Village, Kuixiping Village, Yanhuai Village, Jiaotang Village, Chenjiazhuang Village, Laowuxi Village, Huangshaxi Village, Lujiatian Village, Muliu Village, Yinxuan Village, Wuhan Village, and Xinlong Village (白羊社区、永兴村、奎溪坪村、言槐村、角塘村、陈家庄村、老屋溪村、黄沙溪村、卢家田村、木榴村、银玄村、雾寒村、新龙村).
