= Xihe, Hunan =

Xihe Town 西河镇
- Town
- Location in Hunan
- Coordinates: 27°49′36″N 111°10′46″E
- Country: People's Republic of China
- Province: Hunan
- Prefecture-level city: Loudi
- County: Xinhua

Population
  - Total: 66,000
- Time zone: UTC+8 (China Standard)
- Postal code: 417632
- Area code: 0738

Xihe Town (simplified Chinese: 西河镇; traditional Chinese: 西河鎮; pinyin: Xīhé Zhèn) is an urban town in Xinhua County, Hunan Province, People's Republic of China.

== Administrative divisions ==
The town is divided into fifty-two villages and two communities: Zhaiqian Community, Xuefeng Community, Hengyang Village, Su'e Village, Chenjiashan Village, Shuangti Village, Niaoshan Village, Xin'e Village, Lixing Village, Tianma Village, Xihe Village, Donghe Village, Etang Village, Zhemuling Village, Yaqiao Village, Kuangshan Village, Jiangshuiwan Village, Wuyi Village, Qiyi Village, Shuangjia Village, Xiaotao Village, Xiaoshui Village, Huashi Village, Hutian Village, Dengjia Village, Duanjia Village, Duijia Village, Taiping Village, Shuanghe Village, Dashi Village, Tieshi Village, Jianfeng Village, Jiaqiao Village, Zhuxi Village, Jiangxi Village, Cushi Village, Xintian Village, Xinkai Village, Xinmin Village, Jinsha Village, Xinpu Village, Mingzhuang Village, Wusi Village, Zhengzhong Village, Qingshi Village, Dapeng Village, Youjia Village, Liujia Village, Shajiang Village, Hexi Village, Xinjia Village, and Xinglin Village (寨前社区、雪峰社区、横阳村、苏俄村、陈家山村、双蹄村、鸟山村、新鹅村、利兴村、天马村、西河村、东河村、鹅塘村、柘木岭村、鸭桥村、矿山村、江水湾村、五一村、七一村、双佳村、小桃村、小水村、滑石村、湖田村、邓家村、段家村、对家村、太坪村、双河村、大石村、铁山村、铁石村、尖峰村、架桥村、朱溪村、江西村、粗石村、新田村、新开村、新民村、金沙村、新铺村、明庄村、五四村、正中村、青石村、大鹏村、游家村、刘家村、沙江村、河西村、新加村、兴林村).
