= Gulou, Anhua =

Gulou Township 古楼乡
- Township
- Location in Hunan
- Coordinates: 28°09′28″N 111°04′07″E
- Country: People's Republic of China
- Province: Hunan
- Prefecture-level city: Yiyang
- County: Anhua County

Area
  - Total: 171.83 km^{2} (66.34 sq mi)

Population
  - Total: 12,400
  - Density: 72.2/km^{2} (187/sq mi)
- Time zone: UTC+8 (China Standard)
- Area code: 0737

Gulou Township (simplified Chinese: 古楼乡; traditional Chinese: 古樓鄉; pinyin: Gǔlóu Xiāng) is a rural township in Anhua County, Hunan Province, People's Republic of China.

== Administrative divisions ==
The township is divided into 24 villages, which include the following areas: Gulouping Village, Nianyu Village, Fangshi Village, Zhuangli Village, Xintan Village, Sanqing Village, Liexi Village, Mengqi Village, Gong'an Village, Fengxiang Village, Mangxi Village, Laxi Village, Qingsong Village, Xinsong Village, Xinlin Village, Shenwan Village, Xiawan Village, Baishui Village, Anlin Village, Jianxin Village, Hexie Village, Sanhe Village, Xianlong Village, Suoyan Village, and Xinli Village (古楼坪村、年鱼村、方石村、庄里村、新潭村、三青村、烈溪村、蒙棋村、公安村、枫香村、蟒溪村、腊溪村、青松村、新林村、神湾村、夏湾村、白水村、安林村、建新村、和谐村、三合村、仙龙村、锁岩村、新立村).
