= Jiqing, Xinhua =

Jiqing Town 吉庆镇
- Town
- Location in Hunan
- Coordinates: 27°57′36″N 111°25′44″E
- Country: People's Republic of China
- Province: Hunan
- Prefecture-level city: Loudi
- County: Xinhua County

Area
  - Total: 181.8 km^{2} (70.2 sq mi)

Population
  - Total: 46,000
  - Density: 250/km^{2} (660/sq mi)
- Time zone: UTC+8 (China Standard)
- Postal code: 417621
- Area code: 0738

Jiqing Town (simplified Chinese: 吉庆镇; traditional Chinese: 吉慶鎮; pinyin: Jíqìng Zhèn) is an urban town in and subdivision of Xinhua County, Hunan Province, People's Republic of China.

== Administrative divisions ==
The town is divided into 54 villages and one community, which include the following areas:

- Jinxing Community
- Da'anshan Village
- Jiqing Village
- Qixin Village
- Huchangshan Village
- Qishuping Village
- Nanpanshan Village
- Huoshiwan Village
- Xiaoyidang Village
- Xinlong Village
- Baiwanli Village
- Huashan Village
- Donghua Village
- Xinlian Village
- Ping'an Village
- Hengtian Village
- Shima Village
- Jianping Village
- Zhongshuitian Village
- Shiqiaowan Village
- Shangshuitian Village
- Zhangjialing Village
- Nanshan Village
- Jietouling Village
- Deming Village
- Dayuanxi Village
- Qingdang Village
- Jianming Village
- Yangqiao Village
- Guangming Village
- Pingtang Village
- Shengzuwan Village
- Changpai Village
- Zhaohui Village
- Longjing Village
- Laotangchong Village
- Damen'ao Village
- Furongfeng Village
- Chongshan Village
- Zimushan Village
- Lianfeng Village
- Xiaochong Village
- Mufang Village
- Youxiqiao Village
- Chenguang Village
- Dufudang Village
- Songjialing Village
- Tangjing Village
- Dashenshan Village
- Zhengfangchong Village
- Shanmuchong Village
- Fengmuxi Village
- Liuhua Village
- Xiaozhushan Village
- Jiangdixia Village
