= Zhexi Dam =

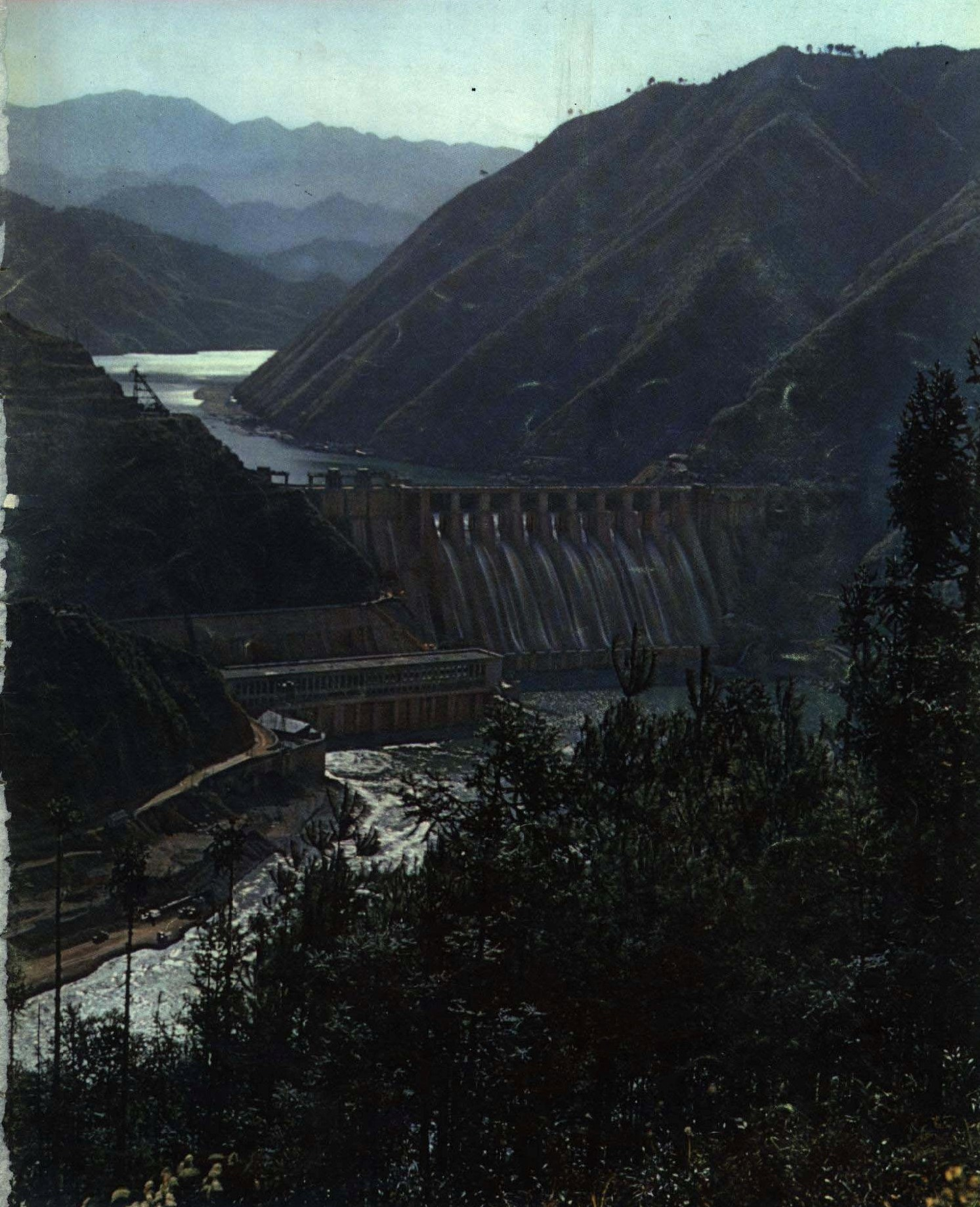

- Location within China
- Country: China
- Location: Zhexi, Anhua County, Hunan Province
- Coordinates: 28°19′43.97″N 111°7′38.09″E
- Purpose: Power, navigation
- Status: Operational
- Construction began: 1958
- Opening date: 1962; 64 years ago

Dam and spillways
- Type of dam: Buttress, massive concrete
- Impounds: Zi Shui River
- Height: 104 m (341 ft)
- Length: 330 m (1,080 ft)

Reservoir
- Total capacity: 3,656,000,000 m^{3} (2,964,000 acre⋅ft)
- Surface area: 48.8 km^{2} (18.8 mi^{2})

Power Station
- Commission date: 1962-1975, 2010
- Type: Conventional
- Turbines: 2 x 250 MW, 5 x 75 MW, 1 x 72.5 MW Francis-type
- Installed capacity: 947.5 MW

The Zhexi Dam is a buttress dam on the Zi Shui River near Zhexi in Anhua County of Hunan Province, China. The primary purpose of the dam is hydroelectric power generation and it supports a 947.5 MW power station. Construction began on the dam in June 1958 and the first generator was operational on 28 January 1962. The last of the five original generators was commissioned in 1975. In 1977 a 30-ton ship lift was completed on the left bank of the dam. The power station was expanded by 2010 to increase the installed capacity by 500 MW, from 447.5 MW to 947.5 MW.

== See also ==
- List of dams and reservoirs in China
- List of tallest dams in China
