= Fenglin Subdistrict =

Subdistrict of Xinhua County in Hunan, China

Fenglin Subdistrict (Chinese: 枫林街道; pinyin: Fēnglín Jiēdào) is a subdistrict of Xinhua County in Hunan, China. The subdistrict was incorporated from a part of the former Shangmei Town on November 6, 2017. It has an area of 49.5 km^{2} (19.1 sq mi) with a population of 53,600 (as of 2017). The subdistrict has nine villages and seven communities under its jurisdiction. Its seat is Fenglinxincun Village (Chinese: 枫林新村).

== Subdivisions ==
Fenglin Subdistrict has nine villages and seven communities under its jurisdiction, as of its creation in 2017.

7 communities

- Huochezhan Community (Chinese: 火车站社区)
- Wuliting Community (Chinese: 五里亭社区)
- Huaxin Community (Chinese: 华新社区)
- Shangtian Community (Chinese: 上田社区)
- Liaoyuan Community (Chinese: 燎原社区)
- Xintian Community (Chinese: 新田社区)
- Ma'anshan Community (Chinese: 马鞍山社区)

9 villages

- Xingyue Village (Chinese: 星月村)
- Hongda Village (Chinese: 洪大村)
- Fengshuxincun Village (Chinese: 枫林新村)
- Jielong Village (Chinese: 接龙村)
- Wanjiaqiao Village (Chinese: 万家桥村)
- Dashuiping Village (Chinese: 大水坪村)
- Xintang Village (Chinese: 新塘村)
- Huanglong Village (Chinese: 黄龙村)
- Xiangrong Village (Chinese: 向荣村) from Sangzi Town
