= Nanjin, Anhua =

Nanjin Township 南金乡
- Township
- Location in Hunan
- Coordinates: 28°12′23″N 111°03′42″E
- Country: People's Republic of China
- Province: Hunan
- Prefecture-level city: Yiyang
- County: Anhua

Area
  - Total: 194.84 km^{2} (75.23 sq mi)

Population
  - Total: 12,000
  - Density: 62/km^{2} (160/sq mi)
- Time zone: UTC+8 (China Standard)
- Area code: 0737

Nanjin Township (simplified Chinese: 南金乡; traditional Chinese: 南金鄉; pinyin: Nánjīn Xiāng) is a rural township in Anhua County, Hunan Province, People's Republic of China.

== Administrative divisions ==
The township is divided into 14 villages, which include the following areas: Nanjin Village, Baotai Village, Lianwan Village, Baotashan Village, Youfu Village, Sanlong Village, Jiangjun Village, Qibai Village, Xiejia Village, Jiulongchi Village, Huamu Village, Hexing Village, Pixi Village, and Tiankou Village (南金村、包台村、连湾村、宝塔山村、有福村、三龙村、将军村、七百村、卸甲村、九龙池村、花木村、合兴村、毗溪村、田口村).
