= Menggong, Hunan =

Menggong Town 孟公镇
- Town
- Location in Hunan
- Coordinates: 27°54′04″N 111°10′09″E
- Country: People's Republic of China
- Province: Hunan
- Prefecture-level city: Loudi
- County: Xinhua

Area
  - Total: 114.4 km^{2} (44.2 sq mi)

Population
  - Total: 65,000
  - Density: 570/km^{2} (1,500/sq mi)
- Time zone: UTC+8 (China Standard)
- Postal code: 417605
- Area code: 0738

Menggong Town (simplified Chinese: 孟公镇; traditional Chinese: 孟公鎮; pinyin: Mènggōng Zhèn) is an urban town in Xinhua County, Hunan Province, People's Republic of China.

== Administrative divisions ==
The town is divided into 55 villages and one community, which include the following areas:

- Menggongqiao Community
- Dashumiao Village
- Pingdi Village
- Taiyan Village
- Baiyanzhai Village
- Shechong Village
- Jinjia Village
- Taoxi Village
- Jianshan Village
- Dongxia Village
- Xingliao Village
- Yuanjing Village
- Changpo Village
- Lutian Village
- Laoping Village
- Tangxia Village
- Taiyang Village
- Zhenitang Village
- Xingguang Village
- Qiatou Village
- Qiaotouwan Village
- Xiaomen Village
- Gaocang Village
- Jilong Village
- Jiufeng Village
- Peixi Village
- Shi'ao Village
- Fengmu Village
- Huani Village
- Mingxing Village
- Hongxing Village
- Fujia Village
- Menggong Village
- Shilong Village
- Taiping Village
- Yuetang Village
- Qingshui Village
- Changchun Village
- Zilong Village
- Ruiyang Village
- Xingtang Village
- Xinyan Village
- Zhenglong Village
- Jiulong Village
- Shuanglong Village
- Hongguang Village
- Baota Village
- Laowu Village
- Jingjia Village
- Beifeng Village
- Shazhou Village
- Chaofeng Village
- Zanxi Village
- Longxi Village
- Quxishan Village
- Longyuan Village
