= Yangjiaotang =

Yangjiaotang Town 羊角塘镇
- Town
- Location in Hunan
- Coordinates: 28°32′07″N 111°36′50″E
- Country: People's Republic of China
- Province: Hunan
- Prefecture-level city: Yiyang
- County: Anhua

Area
  - Total: 246.8 km^{2} (95.3 sq mi)

Population
  - Total: 62,400
  - Density: 253/km^{2} (655/sq mi)
- Time zone: UTC+8 (China Standard)
- Area code: 0737

Yangjiaotang Town (simplified Chinese: 羊角塘镇; traditional Chinese: 羊角塘鎮; pinyin: Yángjiǎotáng Zhèn) is an urban town in Anhua County, Hunan Province, People's Republic of China.

== Administrative divisions ==
The town is divided into 27 villages and 2 communities, which include the following areas: Yangjiao Community, Jinji Community, Tangjiu Village, Renmin Village, Jinfeng Village, Jinlong Village, Dongmu Village, Baiyang Village, Panxi Village, Baishaxi Village, Shiniu Village, Fenshui Village, Yufeng Village, Dayan Village, Huajia Village, Yinxi Village, Xiaoping Village, Zhanxi Village, Wangjiaping Village, Yunling Village, Yunpan Village, Chang'an Village, Muli Village, Lianxing Village, Yeyatang Village, Xiandongling Village, Fuquan Village, Xinliang Village, and Zhutian Village (羊角社区、金鸡社区、塘九村、人民村、金丰村、金龙村、董木村、柏杨村、潘溪村、白沙溪村、石牛村、汾水村、裕丰村、大岩村、花甲村、银溪村、晓坪村、湛溪村、王家坪村、云灵村、云盘村、常安村、睦鲤村、联兴村、野鸭塘村、仙洞岭村、富泉村、新良村、竹田村).
