= Taoxi, Anhua =

Taoxi Town 滔溪镇
- Town
- Location in Hunan
- Coordinates: 28°22′32″N 111°33′35″E
- Country: People's Republic of China
- Province: Hunan
- Prefecture-level city: Yiyang
- County: Anhua

Area
  - Total: 154.2 km^{2} (59.5 sq mi)

Population
  - Total: 22,500
  - Density: 146/km^{2} (378/sq mi)
- Time zone: UTC+8 (China Standard)
- Area code: 0737

Taoxi Town (simplified Chinese: 滔溪镇; traditional Chinese: 滔溪鎮; pinyin: Tāoxī Zhèn) is an urban town in Anhua County, Hunan Province, People's Republic of China.

== Administrative divisions ==
The town is divided into 12 villages and 2 communities, which include the following areas: Taodong Community, Taoxi Community, Changle Village, Nanshan Village, Leping Village, Yingjia Village, Fanggu Village, Doushan Village, He'an Village, Xinlian Village, Longdong Village, Wenxi Village, Meilanping Village, and Shangma Village (滔东社区、滔溪社区、长乐村、南山村、乐坪村、英家村、方谷村、斗山村、和安村、新联村、龙洞村、文溪村、梅兰坪村、上马村).
