= Qingtangpu, Anhua =

Qingtangpu Town 清塘铺镇
- Town
- Location in Hunan
- Coordinates: 28°03′35″N 111°45′08″E
- Country: People's Republic of China
- Province: Hunan
- Prefecture-level city: Yiyang
- County: Anhua

Area
  - Total: 234 km^{2} (90 sq mi)

Population
  - Total: 57,700
  - Density: 247/km^{2} (639/sq mi)
- Time zone: UTC+8 (China Standard)
- Area code: 0737

Qingtangpu Town (simplified Chinese: 清塘铺镇; traditional Chinese: 清塘鋪鎮; pinyin: Qīngtángpū Zhèn) is an urban town in Anhua County, Hunan Province, People's Republic of China.

== Administrative divisions ==
The town is divided into 29 villages and 3 communities, which include the following areas: Qingtang Community, Huichun Community, Yuantao Community, Xiaoqiaopu Village, Wutong Village, Jiuzeping Village, Dongtian Village, Balitan Village, Luotong Village, Zengjiaqiao Village, Sangshuping Village, Long'aoping Village, Tanshu Village, Zhongshi Village, Shiban Village, Xiaxi Village, Suxi Village, Lishan'ao Village, Biyan Village, Niujiaotang Village, Muqiao Village, Taipingduan Village, Shanxi Village, Changle Village, Liaojia Village, Tangwan Village, Shashan Village, Yunwushan Village, Hongyan Village, Yushui Village, Shaping Village, Wenfeng Village (清塘社区、回春社区、袁桃社区、晓桥铺村、梧桐村、久泽坪村、洞天村、八里潭村、罗峒村、曾家桥村、桑树坪村、龙坳坪村、檀树村、中石村、石板村、下溪村、苏溪村、栗山坳村、碧岩村、牛角塘村、木桥村、太平塅村、山溪村、长乐村、寥家村、塘湾村、杉山村、云雾山村、红岩村、鱼水村、沙坪村、文丰村).
