= Shangmei Subdistrict =

Subdistrict of Xinhua County, Hunan, China

Shangmei Subdistrict (Chinese: 上梅街道; pinyin: Shàngméi Jiēdào) is a subdistrict and the seat of Xinhua County in Hunan, China. The subdistrict was incorporated from part of the former Shangmei Town on November 6, 2017. It has an area of 42.99 km^{2} (16.60 sq mi) with a population of 85,800 (as of 2017). The subdistrict has 11 villages and 16 communities under its jurisdiction, its seat is at Yingbin Road (Chinese: 迎宾路).

== Subdivisions ==
Shangmei Subdistrict has 11 villages and 15 communities under its jurisdiction, as of its creation in 2017.

15 communities

- Beita Community (Chinese: 北塔社区)
- Chongyangling Community (Chinese: 崇阳岭社区)
- Dongwai Community (Chinese: 东外社区)
- Fujingshan Community (Chinese: 福景山社区)
- Gongnong Community (Chinese: 工农社区)
- Gongnonghe Community (Chinese: 工农河社区)
- Lixinqiao Community (Chinese: 立新桥社区)
- Meishu Community (Chinese: 梅树社区)
- Paomaling Community (Chinese: 跑马岭社区)
- Pingshanlong Community (Chinese: 坪山垅社区)
- Qingshijie Community (Chinese: 青石街社区)
- Shizijie Community (Chinese: 十字街社区)
- Yongxing Community (Chinese: 永兴社区)
- Yuanzhuling Community (Chinese: 园株岭社区)
- Yuxugong Community (Chinese: 玉虚宫社区)

11 villages

- Beidu Village (Chinese: 北渡村)
- Hexing Village (Chinese: 和兴村)
- Hongqixincun Village (Chinese: 红旗新村)
- Hongxing Village (Chinese: 鸿兴村)
- Huashan Village (Chinese: 花山村)
- Huayuan Village (Chinese: 花园村) from Youjia Town
- Jiangxi Village (Chinese: 江溪村) from Ketou Township
- Jizhong Village (Chinese: 集中村)
- Maojialong Village (Chinese: 毛家垅村)
- Xiatian Village (Chinese: 下田村)
- Xindu Village (Chinese: 新渡村)
