= Xiaoyan, Anhua =

Xiaoyan Town 小淹镇
- Town
- Location in Hunan
- Coordinates: 28°23′57″N 111°29′28″E
- Country: People's Republic of China
- Province: Hunan
- Prefecture-level city: Yiyang
- County: Anhua

Area
  - Total: 177.05 km^{2} (68.36 sq mi)

Population
  - Total: 36,200
  - Density: 204/km^{2} (530/sq mi)
- Time zone: UTC+8 (China Standard)
- Area code: 0737

Xiaoyan Town (simplified Chinese: 小淹镇; traditional Chinese: 小淹鎮; pinyin: Xiǎoyān Zhèn) is an urban town in Anhua County, Hunan Province, People's Republic of China.

== Administrative divisions ==
The town is divided into 18 villages and 3 communities, which include the following areas: Fuxi Community, Xiaoyan Community, Baisha Community, Lao'an Village, Baizu Village, Shifeng Village, Changchong Village, Shuangqiao Village, Baisha Village, Baizhiyuan Village, Yangsi Village, Bailian Village, Shengli Village, Shuangxian Village, Xiaojia Village, Taoshu Village, Bixi Village, Baifu Village, Xingfu Village, and Baihua Village (敷溪社区、小淹社区、白沙社区、老安村、百足村、石峰村、长冲村、双桥村、白沙村、苞芷园村、杨思村、白莲村、胜利村、双仙村、金双村、肖家村、陶澍村、碧溪村、百福村、幸福村、百花村).
