= Tianping, Xinhua =

Tianping Town 田坪镇
- Town
- Location in Hunan
- Coordinates: 27°55′36″N 111°34′51″E
- Country: People's Republic of China
- Province: Hunan
- Prefecture-level city: Loudi
- County: Xinhua

Area
  - Total: 134.4 km^{2} (51.9 sq mi)

Population
  - Total: 38,000
  - Density: 280/km^{2} (730/sq mi)
- Time zone: UTC+8 (China Standard)
- Postal code: 417623
- Area code: 0738

Tianping Town (simplified Chinese: 田坪镇; traditional Chinese: 田坪鎮; pinyin: Tiánpíng Zhèn) is an urban town in Xinhua County, Hunan Province, People's Republic of China.

== Administrative divisions ==
The town is divided into 46 villages and one community, which include the following areas: Fengshu Community, Shangxin Village, Dabatang Village, Dajiangbian Village, Zoujiang Village, Langjiang Village, Tucha Village, Baiyan Village, Bailong Village, Sunliu Village, Shibei Village, Jizhong Village, Sanlian Village, Nanchong Village, Jinpen Village, Yuehua Village, Xingxing Village, Fuxing Village, Yanzhu Village, Sanmenshi Village, Yantoushan Village, Pengcheng Village, Tiandang Village, Qiaoting Village, Yunxiao Village, Maojiadang Village, Pingli Village, Tuqiao Village, Fanong Village, Tangwanli Village, Wuxing Village, Tianping Village, Huguang Village, Xianchong Village, Meihua Village, Jixing Village, Xingguang Village, Lianmeng Village, Yangliuchong Village, Heheqiao Village, Tangshang Village, Jinshi Village, Kuzhushan Village, Risheng Village, Longtan Village, Shamaochong Village, and Jianjun Village (枫树社区、上新村、大坝塘村、大江边村、邹江村、浪江村、土茶村、白岩村、白龙村、孙刘村、石碑村、集中村、三联村、南冲村、金盆村、月华村、星星村、福星村、烟竹村、三门石村、岩头山村、鹏程村、田凼村、桥亭村、云霄桥村、毛家凼村、坪里村、土桥村、发农村、塘湾里村、五星村、田坪村、湖广村、枧冲村、美华村、吉星村、星光村、联盟村、杨柳冲村、和合桥村、塘上村、金石村、苦竹山村、日升村、龙潭村、纱帽冲村、建军村).
