= Shuiche, Hunan =

Shuiche Town 水车镇
- Town
- Location in Hunan
- Coordinates: 27°40′47″N 110°59′37″E
- Country: People's Republic of China
- Province: Hunan
- Prefecture-level city: Loudi
- County: Xinhua

Area
  - Total: 121.25 km^{2} (46.81 sq mi)

Population
  - Total: 10,000
  - Density: 82/km^{2} (210/sq mi)
- Time zone: UTC+8 (China Standard)
- Postal code: 417629
- Area code: 0738

Shuiche Town (simplified Chinese: 水车镇; traditional Chinese: 水車鎮; pinyin: Shuǐchē Zhèn) is an urban town in Xinhua County, Hunan Province, People's Republic of China.

== Administrative divisions ==
The town is divided into 35 villages and one community:

- Zique Community (紫鹊社区)
- Shuiche Village (水车村)
- Qingjiang Village (清江村)
- Fuzhu Village (扶竹村)
- Zhile Village (直乐村)
- Shihe Village (石禾村)
- Changshi Village (长石村)
- Gucheng Village (古城村)
- Gonghe Village (共和村)
- Tangjia Village (塘家村)
- Louxia Village (楼下村)
- Datong Village (大同村)
- Huanglong Village (黄龙村)
- Dongxi Village (东溪村)
- Mojia Village (莫家村)
- Xianshi Village (仙石村)
- Chongyang Village (崇阳村)
- Jianguo Village (建国村)
- Sanjiao Village (三角村)
- Daoguan Village (道观村)
- Shangxi Village (上溪村)
- Tianjia Village (田家村)
- Jishan Village (吉山村)
- Mijia Village (米家村)
- Xixi Village (锡溪村)
- Fengjia Village (奉家村)
- Baishui Village (白水村)
- Longpu Village (龙普村)
- Shifeng Village (石丰村)
- Laozhuang Village (老庄村)
- Jinlong Village (金龙村)
- Longxiang Village (龙湘村)
- Zhenglong Village (正龙村)
- Baiyuan Village (白源村)
- Liushuang Village (柳双村)
- Jingzhu Village (荆竹村)
