= Youxi Township =

Youxi Township 油溪乡
- Township
- Location in Hunan
- Coordinates: 27°57′57″N 111°17′24″E
- Country: People's Republic of China
- Province: Hunan
- Prefecture-level city: Loudi
- County: Xinhua

Area
  - Total: 87.8 km^{2} (33.9 sq mi)

Population
  - Total: 28,000
  - Density: 320/km^{2} (830/sq mi)
- Time zone: UTC+8 (China Standard)
- Postal code: 417612
- Area code: 0738

Youxi Township (simplified Chinese: 油溪乡; traditional Chinese: 油溪鄉; pinyin: Yóuxī Xiāng) is a rural township in Xinhua County, Hunan Province, People's Republic of China.

== Administrative divisions ==
The township is divided into 38 villages, which include the following areas: Laowuling Village, Hengguo Village, Youxi Village, Xufeng Village, Raojia Village, Yanmen Village, Maopingyuan Village, Datang Village, Tieshanjiang Village, Shuxi Village, Dongxi Village, Luojialing Village, Xiashuitian Village, Baijialing Village, Zhoujiayuan Village, Changchongwan Village, Zhongjiazhuang Village, Diansheng Village, Shizhu Village, Gaoqiao Village, Qinglong Village, Changxi Village, Jiangtianyao Village, Fenjie Village, Xiaojia Village, Niuche Village, Zhonglian Village, Bailu Village, Ziyuan Village, Zhaojia Village, Longtang Village, Dongfanghong Village, Wujiachong Village, Jiujiping Village, Qianjin Village, Yanzhushan Village, Zhifeng Village, and Lianhua'an Village (老屋岭村、横过村、油溪村、续丰村、饶家村、岩门村、毛坪院村、大塘村、铁山江村、蜀溪村、洞溪村、罗家岭村、下水田村、白家岭村、周家院村、长冲湾村、中家庄村、淀生村、实竹村、高桥村、青龙村、长溪村、江田窑村、芬阶村、肖家村、牛车村、中联村、白芦村、资源村、赵家村、龙塘村、东方红村、伍家冲村、鸠鸡坪村、前进村、烟竹山村、指丰村、莲花庵村).
