= Yichongqiao =

Yichongqiao Township
- Township

Chinese transcription(s)
  - Simplified: 宜冲桥乡
  - Traditional: 宜沖橋鄉
  - Pinyin: Yichongqiao Xiang
- Location in China
- Coordinates: 29°20′00″N 110°51′29″E
- Country: People's Republic of China
- Province: Hunan
- City: Zhangjiajie
- County: Cili County

Area
  - Total: 30 km^{2} (12 sq mi)

Population
  - Total: 18,000
  - Density: 600/km^{2} (1,600/sq mi)
- Time zone: UTC+8 (China Standard)
- Area code: 0744

Yichongqiao Township (simplified Chinese: 宜冲桥乡; traditional Chinese: 宜沖橋鄉; pinyin: Yichongqiao Xiang) is a rural township in Cili County, Zhangjiajie, Hunan Province, People's Republic of China.

== Administrative divisions ==
The township is divided into 20 villages, which include the following areas: Yichongqiao Village, Shadao Village, Changxing Village, Maoping Village, Yangjiaqiao Village, Nanzhu Village, Yueliangtai Village, Yumidu Village, Xiajiaping Village, Huangniqiao Village, Xiama'an Village, Renjiaping Village, Jiulong Village, Xiejiazhuang Village, Changlinggang Village, Liaojiayu Village, Chishengyu Village, Longxiang'an Village, Yanyu Village, and Guanzhuang Village (宜冲桥村、沙刀村、长兴村、茅坪村、杨家桥村、楠竹村、月亮台村、渔米渡村、夏家坪村、黄泥桥村、下马鞍村、任家坪村、九龙村、歇驾庄村、长岭岗村、廖家峪村、赤生峪村、龙象庵村、岩峪村、官庄村).
