= Dongping, Anhua =

Dongping Town 东坪镇
- Town
- Location in Hunan
- Coordinates: 28°22′54″N 111°13′10″E
- Country: People's Republic of China
- Province: Hunan
- Prefecture-level city: Yiyang
- County: Anhua County

Area
  - Total: 199.5 km^{2} (77.0 sq mi)

Population
  - Total: 95,000
  - Density: 480/km^{2} (1,200/sq mi)
- Time zone: UTC+8 (China Standard)
- Area code: 0737

Dongping Town (simplified Chinese: 东坪镇; traditional Chinese: 東坪鎮; pinyin: Dōngpíng Zhèn) is an urban town and the seat of Anhua County in Hunan, China.

== Administrative divisions ==
The town is divided into 37 villages and 7 communities, which include the following areas: Minzhu Community, Zijiang Community, Jianshe Community, Huanghe Community, Youcha Community, Huangshaping Community, Tangshi Community, Nibuqiao Village, Youzhou Village, Yanggong Village, Chongyangguan Village, Shuangxi Village, Dacheng Village, Linjia Village, Zhongdi Village, Chenshan Village, Yanglin Village, Dahu Village, Zhuxikou Village, Muzi Village, Changtian Village, Yixi Village, Yanjia Village, Dayuan Village, Baixuan Village, Mangdong Village, Renping Village, Pingxi Village, Xiaoxi Village, Xiangang Village, Yuxi Village, Qingshanyuan Village, Shuangqing Village, Madu Village, Meixi Village, Liuping Village, Yanwan Village, Xinju Village, Chaxi Village, Yanzhu Village, Wuhexin Village, Chengxi Village, Liushutang Village, and Tiejia Village (original names: 民主社区、资江社区、建设社区、黄合社区、酉茶社区、黄沙坪社区、唐市社区、泥埠桥村、酉州村、羊公村、崇阳观村、双溪村、大城村、林家村、中砥村、辰山村、杨林村、大湖村、株溪口村、木子村、长田村、伊溪村、颜家村、大园村、百选村、芒东村、任坪村、坪溪村、小溪村、仙缸村、玉溪村、青山园村、双青村、马渡村、梅溪村、柳坪村、岩湾村、新局村、槎溪村、烟竹村、吴合新村、城西村、柳树塘村、铁家村).
