= Meicheng, Hunan =

Meicheng Town 梅城镇
- Town
- Location in Hunan
- Coordinates: 28°08′31″N 111°38′40″E
- Country: People's Republic of China
- Province: Hunan
- Prefecture-level city: Yiyang
- County: Anhua

Area
  - Total: 282 km^{2} (109 sq mi)

Population
  - Total: 95,000
  - Density: 340/km^{2} (870/sq mi)
- Time zone: UTC+8 (China Standard)
- Area code: 0737

Meicheng Town (simplified Chinese: 梅城镇; traditional Chinese: 梅城鎮; pinyin: Méichéng Zhèn) is an urban town in Anhua County, Hunan Province, People's Republic of China.

== Administrative divisions ==
The town is divided into 34 villages and 4 communities, which include the following areas: Beijie Community, Dongjie Community, Nanjie Community, Xijie Community, Xijie Village, Nanjie Village, Dongjie Village, Long'an Village, Ziyun Village, Liangjiang Village, Liangyi Village, Wangcheng Village, Sanli Village, Shili Village, Lujiaoxi Village, Nanqiao Village, Daoguan Village, Jianzhang Village, Maotianpu Village, Qi'an Village, Dawantang Village, Xingcha Village, Zhongtian Village, Pu'ao Village, Sumei Village, Huangni Village, Yanggao Village, Qingshui Village, Shuangjiangkou Village, Lilin Village, Songshan Village, Baishu Village, Chang'an Village, Shuangfu Village, Jiangwan Village, Lixing Village, Yunhe Village, and Yanxi Village (北街社区、东街社区、南街社区、西街社区、西街村、南街村、东街村、龙安村、紫云村、良将村、梁乙村、望城村、三里村、十里村、鹿角溪村、南桥村、道观村、建樟村、茅田铺村、启安村、大弯塘村、兴茶村、中田村、铺坳村、苏梅村、黄泥村、杨高村、清水村、双江口村、栗林村、松山村、柏树村、长安村、双富村、江湾村、栗星村、云河村、岩溪村).
