= Changtang, Anhua =

Changtang Town 长塘镇
- Town
- Location in Hunan
- Coordinates: 28°21′48″N 111°46′01″E
- Country: People's Republic of China
- Province: Hunan
- Prefecture-level city: Yiyang
- County: Anhua County

Area
  - Total: 177 km^{2} (68 sq mi)

Population
  - Total: 13,200
  - Density: 74.6/km^{2} (193/sq mi)
- Time zone: UTC+8 (China Standard)
- Area code: 0737

Changtang Town (simplified Chinese: 长塘镇; traditional Chinese: 長塘鎮; pinyin: Chángtáng Zhèn) is an urban town in and subdivision of Anhua County, Hunan Province, People's Republic of China.

== Administrative divisions ==
The town is divided into 17 villages and 2 communities, which include the following areas: Linshantangchong Community, Changtang Community, Lanxi Village, Luoxi Village, Zhongshan Village, Xinbaiyang Village, Shihua Village, Gonghe Village, Jiangyi Village, Waliu Village, Yangtian Village, Yonghe Village, Hexin Village, Bohuatai Village, Dajinxi Village, Hezhen Village, Yuefeng Village, Yashan Village, and Jinyin Village (林山塘冲社区、长塘社区、兰溪村、罗溪村、中山村、新白羊村、石花村、共和村、蒋义村、瓦柳村、杨田村、永和村、合欣村、箔花台村、大金溪村、合振村、岳峰村、丫山村、金银村).
