= Fengjia, Hunan =

Fengjia 奉家镇
- Town
- Location in Hunan
- Coordinates: 27°47′49″N 110°51′37″E
- Country: People's Republic of China
- Province: Hunan
- Prefecture-level city: Loudi
- County: Xinhua County

Area
  - Total: 246 km^{2} (95 sq mi)

Population
  - Total: 21,000
  - Density: 85/km^{2} (220/sq mi)
- Time zone: UTC+8 (China Standard)
- Postal code: 417631
- Area code: 0738

Fengjia Town (simplified Chinese: 奉家镇; traditional Chinese: 奉家鎮; pinyin: Fèngjiā Zhèn) is an urban town in and subdivision of Xinhua County, Hunan Province, People's Republic of China.

== Administrative divisions ==
The town is divided into 29 villages and one community:

- Qinren Community (秦人社区)
- Xiangbei Village (向北村)
- Baisha Village (白沙村)
- Hongtian Village (红田村)
- Shuanglin Village (双林村)
- Zhuhu Village (竹湖村)
- Xuanxi Village (玄溪村)
- Shikeng Village (石坑村)
- Yueguang Village (月光村)
- Baomu Village (报木村)
- Chaping Village (茶坪村)
- Chuan'ao Village (川坳村)
- Daqiao Village (大桥村)
- Maoping Village (毛坪村)
- Ganzi Village (杆子村)
- Pingshang Village (坪上村)
- Pingxia Village (坪下村)
- Guanwang Village (关王村)
- Xujia Village (许家村)
- Hengjiang Village (横江村)
- Hengnan Village (横南村)
- Maojia Village (毛家村)
- Henglaping Village (横拉坪村)
- Shangtuan Village (上团村)
- Xiatuan Village (下团村)
- Maoxi Village (卯溪村)
- Moxijiang Village (墨溪江村)
- Zhaiyuan Village (寨园村)
- Yanban Village (岩板村)
