= Zhexi, Anhua =

Zhexi Town 柘溪镇
- Town
- Location in Hunan
- Coordinates: 28°19′43″N 111°06′41″E
- Country: People's Republic of China
- Province: Hunan
- Prefecture-level city: Yiyang
- County: Anhua

Area
  - Total: 142.53 km^{2} (55.03 sq mi)

Population
  - Total: 16,500
  - Density: 116/km^{2} (300/sq mi)
- Time zone: UTC+8 (China Standard)
- Area code: 0737

Zhexi Town (simplified Chinese: 柘溪镇; traditional Chinese: 柘溪鎮; pinyin: Zhèxī Zhèn) is a small town built next to the Zhe Xi Hydro Power Station in Anhua County, Hunan Province, People's Republic of China. It is the location of the Zhexi Dam which was finished in 1962.

== Administrative divisions ==
The town is divided into 9 villages and 2 communities: Zhexi Community, Zhexidianzhan Community, Liping Village, Guangyi Village, Maoping Village, Jiaoyuan Village, Shuangqiao Village, Darongxi Village, Yongwang Village, and Chenxi Village (柘溪社区、柘溪电站社区、梨坪村、广益村、毛坪村、椒园村、双桥村、对溪村、大溶溪村、永旺村、辰溪村).
