= Maoping, Baihe County =

Maoping 茅坪镇
- Town
- Location in China
- Coordinates: 32°42′27″N 109°55′29″E
- Country: People's Republic of China
- Province: Shaanxi
- Prefecture-level city: Ankang
- County: Baihe County
- Time zone: UTC+8 (China Standard)

Maoping (Chinese: 茅坪; pinyin: Máopíng) is a town under the administration of Baihe County, Shaanxi, China. As of 2018, it has one residential community and 15 villages under its administration.
