= Shangdu Subdistrict =

Subdistrict of Hunan, China

Coordinates: 27°44′4.6″N 111°18′52.6″E

Shangdu Subdistrict (Chinese: 上渡街道; pinyin: Shàngdù Jiēdào) is a subdistrict of Xinhua County in Hunan, China. The subdistrict was incorporated through the amalgamation of the former Shangdu Office, three villages of Youjia Town and six villages and a community of Caojia Town on November 6, 2017. It has an area of 53.14 km^{2} (20.52 sq mi) with a population of 50,200 (as of 2017). The subdistrict has nine villages and seven communities under its jurisdiction. Its seat is at East Shangmei Road (Chinese: 上梅东路).

== Subdivisions ==
Shangdu Subdistrict has five villages and 16 communities under its jurisdiction, as of its creation in 2017.

5 communities

- Qiaoding Community (Chinese: 桥东社区) from the former Shangdu Office
- Tangjialing Community (Chinese: 唐家岭社区) from the former Shangdu Office
- Wangcheng Community (Chinese: 望城社区) from the former Shangdu Office
- Xincheng Community (Chinese: 新城社区) from the former Shangdu Office
- Xinyuan Community (Chinese: 新园社区) from Caojia Town

16 villages

- Baisha Village (Chinese: 白沙村) from the former Shangdu Office
- Jinzishan Village (Chinese: 金子山村) from Youjia Town
- Niangjia Village (Chinese: 娘家村) from Caojia Town
- Qilichong Village (Chinese: 七里冲村) from the former Shangdu Office
- Qingyun Village (Chinese: 青云村) from Caojia Town
- Qinjian Village (Chinese: 勤俭村) from Caojia Town
- Qinsan Village (Chinese: 勤三村) from Caojia Town
- Shangdu Village (Chinese: 上渡村) from the former Shangdu Office
- Tashan Village (Chinese: 塔山村) from the former Shangdu Office
- Tianzhu Village (Chinese: 天竺村) from Caojia Town
- Tieniu Village (Chinese: 铁牛村) from the former Shangdu Office
- Tishang Village (Chinese: 堤上村) from Youjia Town
- Xingling Village (Chinese: 兴岭村) from Youjia Town
- Zhimushan Village (Chinese: 梽木山村) from Caojia Town
- Zijiang Village (Chinese: 资江村) from the former Shangdu Office
- Ziyuan Village (Chinese: 资源村) from the former Shangdu Office
