= Maoping, Sichuan =

Maoping 毛坪镇
- Town
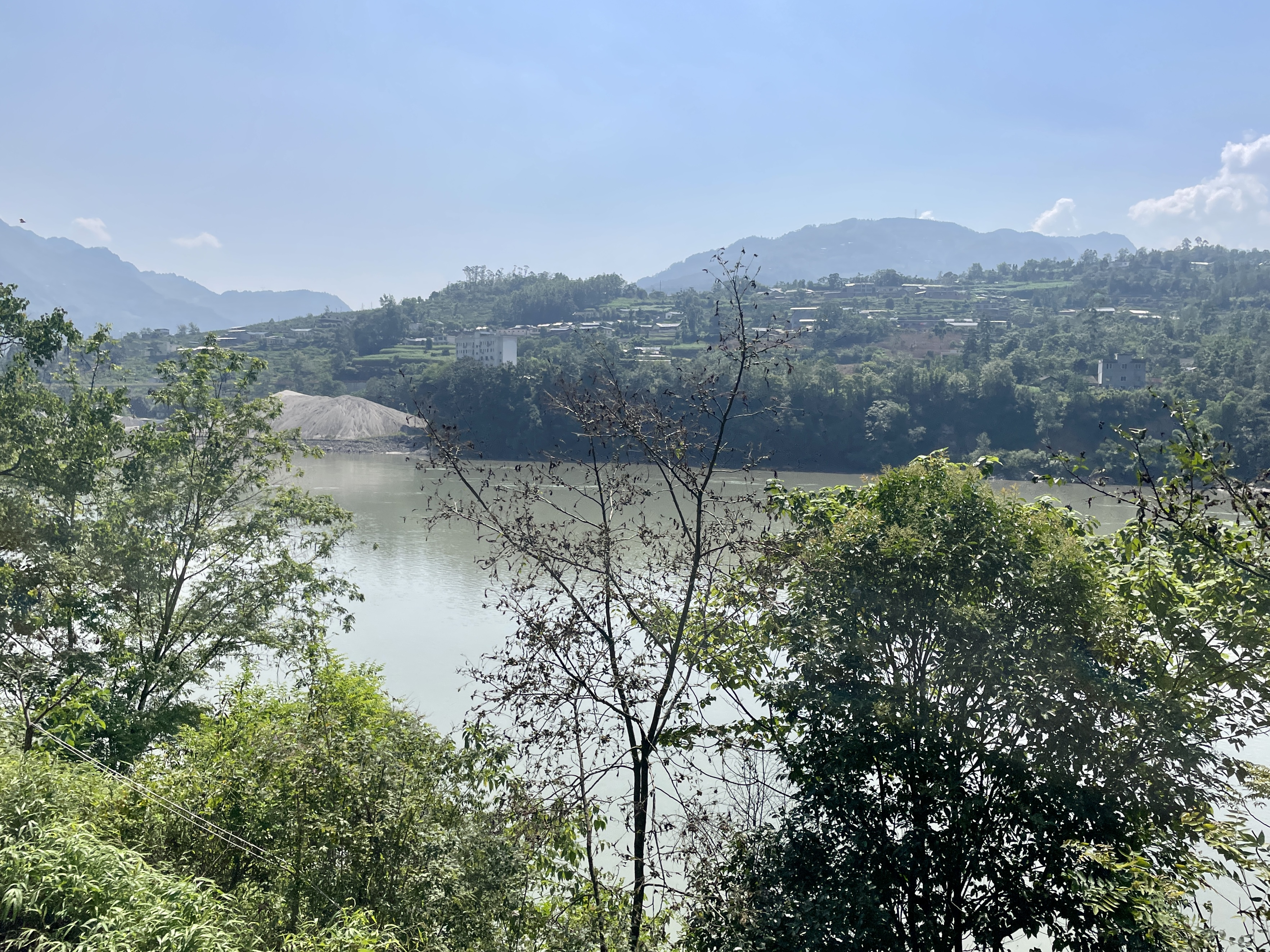
- Maoping Town in 2023

- Location in Sichuan
- Coordinates: 29°17′24″N 103°22′1″E
- Country: People's Republic of China
- Province: Sichuan
- Prefecture-level city: Leshan
- Autonomous county: Ebian Yi Autonomous County
- Time zone: UTC+8 (China Standard)

Maoping (Chinese: 毛坪; pinyin: Máopíng) is a town under the administration of Ebian Yi Autonomous County, Sichuan, China. As of 2018, it has one residential community and 11 villages under its administration.

== See also ==
- List of township-level divisions of Sichuan
