= Longtang, Anhua =

Longtang Township 龙塘乡
- Township
- Location in Hunan
- Coordinates: 28°27′20″N 111°23′28″E
- Country: People's Republic of China
- Province: Hunan
- Prefecture-level city: Yiyang
- County: Anhua
- Time zone: UTC+8 (China Standard)
- Area code: 0737

Longtang Township (simplified Chinese: 龙塘乡; traditional Chinese: 龍塘鄉; pinyin: Lóngtáng Xiāng) is a rural township in Anhua County, Yiyang, Hunan Province, People's Republic of China.

== Administrative divisions ==
The township is divided into 18 villages, which include the following areas: Hongxing Village, Hemu Village, Dabailong Village, Baixi Village, Shatianxi Village, Xima Village, Taohe Village, Qixin Village, Taojin Village, Jiale Village, Huangshan Village, Fengjia Village, Liuhe Village, Xiazhi Village, Dongfan Village, Yanmen Village, Wansha Village, and Baixi Village (红星村、和睦村、大百龙村、柏溪村、沙田溪村、洗马村、陶贺村、齐心村、陶金村、家乐村、黄山村、封家村、六和村、夏植村、东凡村、岩门村、顽沙村、柏西村).
