= Jiangnan, Anhua =

Jiangnan Town 江南镇
- Town
- Location in Hunan
- Coordinates: 28°23′01″N 111°23′04″E
- Country: People's Republic of China
- Province: Hunan
- Prefecture-level city: Yiyang
- County: Anhua County

Area
  - Total: 131.4 km^{2} (50.7 sq mi)

Population
  - Total: 37,200
  - Density: 283/km^{2} (733/sq mi)
- Time zone: UTC+8 (China Standard)
- Area code: 0737

Jiangnan Town (simplified Chinese: 江南镇; traditional Chinese: 江南鎮; pinyin: Jiāngnán Zhèn) is an urban town at the Zi River in Anhua County, Hunan Province, People's Republic of China.

== Administrative divisions ==
The town is divided into 33 villages and 1 community, which include the following areas: Jiangnan Community, Bianjiang Village, Hongni Village, Fanrong Village, Qingyang Village, Cunliang Village, Aqiu Village, Dongshi Village, Gaocheng Village, Huanghuaxi Village, Zhongdong Village, Dawu Village, Maoping Village, Jintian Village, Qingtian Village, Liping Village, Xitan Village, Zhulin Village, Xingfu Village, Shamao Village, Tianmen Village, Lianmeng Village, Sixian Village, Huangshi Village, Xinmin Village, Maluxin Village, Xinxing Village, Dazhong Village, Chang'er Village, Shaping Village, Meishan Village, Youyi Village, Zhirong Village, and Chenwang Village (江南社区、边江村、红泥村、繁荣村、庆阳村、存粮村、阿丘村、洞市村、高城村、黄花溪村、中洞村、大屋村、茅坪村、金田村、青田村、里坪村、锡潭村、竹林村、幸福村、纱帽村、天门村、联盟村、思贤村、黄石村、新民村、马路新村、新星村、大众村、旸二村、沙坪村、梅山村、友谊村、植荣村、陈王村).
