= Yanxi, Anhua County =

Yanxi Town 烟溪镇
- Town
- Location in Hunan
- Coordinates: 28°07′52″N 110°53′49″E
- Country: People's Republic of China
- Province: Hunan
- Prefecture-level city: Yiyang
- County: Anhua

Area
  - Total: 196 km^{2} (76 sq mi)

Population
  - Total: 25,800
  - Density: 132/km^{2} (341/sq mi)
- Time zone: UTC+8 (China Standard)
- Area code: 0737

Yanxi Town (simplified Chinese: 烟溪镇; traditional Chinese: 煙溪鎮; pinyin: Yānxī Zhèn) is an urban town in Anhua County, Hunan Province, People's Republic of China.

== Administrative divisions ==
The town is divided into 20 villages and 3 communities, which include the following areas: Matang Community, Xianjin Community, Yanxi Community, Shuangtang Village, Fengli Village, Wolong Village, Xiaping Village, Lizixi Village, Shiba Village, Tiancha Village, Yaojia Village, Huanglong Village, Baolong Village, Taoxi Village, Shuangyan Village, Xinyunma Village, Lianhe Village, Chenzhu Village, Shenxi Village, Yangzhu Village, Dayang Village, Huangdongchong Village, and Tongxiqiao Village (马塘社区、先进社区、烟溪社区、双塘村、丰里村、卧龙村、夏坪村、栗子溪村、十八村、天茶村、姚家村、黄龙村、抱龙村、桃溪村、双烟村、新云马村、联合村、陈竹村、深溪村、杨竹村、大阳村、黄洞冲村、通溪桥村).
