= Xianxi, Anhua =

Xianxi Town 仙溪镇
- Town
- Location in Hunan
- Coordinates: 28°14′47″N 111°42′31″E
- Country: People's Republic of China
- Province: Hunan
- Prefecture-level city: Yiyang
- County: Anhua

Area
  - Total: 281.4 km^{2} (108.6 sq mi)

Population
  - Total: 51,000
  - Density: 180/km^{2} (470/sq mi)
- Time zone: UTC+8 (China Standard)
- Area code: 0737

Xianxi Town (simplified Chinese: 仙溪镇; traditional Chinese: 仙溪鎮; pinyin: Xiānxī Zhèn) is an urban town in Anhua County, Hunan Province, People's Republic of China.

== Administrative divisions ==
The town is divided into 25 villages and 1 community, which include the following areas: Xianxi Community, Xianxi Village, Xianzhong Village, Daqiao Village, Zhenshang Village, Shanzhang Village, Jiudushui Village, Sanxing Village, Furong Village, Daxi Village, Shankou Village, Zhenzhong Village, Xianfeng Village, Hedong Village, Sanfeng Village, Qishan Village, Fuxing Village, Longfeng Village, Quanjiang Village, Huatian Village, Shuangfu Village, Xindu Village, Yixi Village, Hongfu Village, Yanfeng Village, and Jiulong Village (仙溪社区、仙溪村、仙中村、大桥村、圳上村、山漳村、九渡水村、三星村、芙蓉村、大溪村、山口村、圳中村、仙峰村、河东村、三丰村、岐山村、富兴村、龙丰村、泉江村、华天村、双富村、鑫都村、伊溪村、宏富村、沿峰村、九龙村).
