= Shichongkou =

Shichongkou Town 石冲口镇
- Town
- Location in Hunan
- Coordinates: 27°39′13″N 111°19′59″E
- Country: People's Republic of China
- Province: Hunan
- Prefecture-level city: Loudi
- County: Xinhua

Area
  - Total: 102 km^{2} (39 sq mi)

Population
  - Total: 56,000
  - Density: 550/km^{2} (1,400/sq mi)
- Time zone: UTC+8 (China Standard)
- Postal code: 417626
- Area code: 0738

Shichongkou Town (simplified Chinese: 石冲口镇; traditional Chinese: 石沖口鎮; pinyin: Shíchōngkǒu Zhèn) is an urban town in Xinhua County, Hunan Province, People's Republic of China.

== Administrative divisions ==
The town is divided into 43 villages and one community, which include the following areas: Chenjiawan Community, Choumu Village, Panjiawan Village, Chaoshuipu Village, Nanyan Village, Yangzhuang Village, Yutian Village, Gaochebian Village, Daqiao Village, Shichongkou Village, Helong Village, Shizhu Village, Mancang Village, Longwangchi Village, Luomaqiao Village, Dawantang Village, Huanqiao Village, Yantang Village, Tiekuangling Village, Liuyi Village, Xiawen Village, Zhongfeng Village, Huaxi Village, Longjiaqiao Village, Baixi Village, Caijia Village, Lvxiang Village, Gaozhuang Village, Shiziling Village, Xiaoyun Village, Congling Village, Dongxiling Village, Xixi Village, Hengpai Village, Anleshan Village, Maoling Village, Wenxi Village, Xiangmenqian Village, Yaogongzhai Village, Banshan Village, Chuan'anling Village, Hanpo'ao Village, Baishiling Village, and Hongzhai Village (陈家湾社区、稠木村、潘家湾村、潮水铺村、南烟村、羊撞村、余田村、高车边村、大桥村、石冲口村、合龙村、实竹村、满仓村、龙王池村、落马桥村、大湾塘村、缓轿村、严塘村、铁矿岭村、六一村、下温村、中峰村、化溪村、龙家桥村、白溪村、蔡家村、绿湘村、高庄村、狮子岭村、晓云村、丛岭村、东溪岭村、西溪村、横排村、安乐山村、茅岭村、温溪村、象门前村、尧公寨村、半山村、川安岭村、寒婆坳村、白石岭村、红寨村).
