= Zuoshi Township =

Zuoshi Township 坐石乡
- Township
- Location in Hunan
- Coordinates: 27°55′54″N 111°27′52″E
- Country: People's Republic of China
- Province: Hunan
- Prefecture-level city: Loudi
- County: Xinhua

Area
  - Total: 87 km^{2} (34 sq mi)

Population
  - Total: 26,000
  - Density: 300/km^{2} (770/sq mi)
- Time zone: UTC+8 (China Standard)
- Postal code: 417613
- Area code: 0738

Zuoshi Township (simplified Chinese: 坐石乡; traditional Chinese: 坐石鄉; pinyin: Zuòshí Xiāng) is a rural township in Xinhua County, Hunan Province, People's Republic of China.

== Administrative divisions ==
The township is divided into 24 villages, which include the following areas: Maoping Village, Lishan Village, Zhongxiaotang Village, Caotouchong Village, Xinhe Village, Hongyan Village, Guangxi Village, Changchong Village, Xinguang Village, Zuoshi Village, Changsheng Village, Bafang Village, Dongzhuang Village, Dongtoushan Village, Shiqiao Village, Xinping Village, Banshanwan Village, Tongxin Village, Taoshu Village, Xiuyan Village, Jintian Village, Ganshan Village, Haidi Village, and Tudian Village (毛坪村、栗山村、忠孝堂村、槽头冲村、新河村、红岩村、光溪村、长冲村、新光村、坐石村、昌盛村、八房村、东庄村、洞头山村、石桥村、新坪村、半山湾村、同心村、桃树村、秀岩村、禁田村、干山村、海池村、土佃村).
