= Luguan, Hunan =

Luguan Town 炉观镇
- Town
- Location in Hunan
- Coordinates: 27°46′15″N 111°10′50″E
- Country: People's Republic of China
- Province: Hunan
- Prefecture-level city: Loudi
- County: Xinhua County

Area
  - Total: 116.5 km^{2} (45.0 sq mi)

Population
  - Total: 61,000
  - Density: 520/km^{2} (1,400/sq mi)
- Time zone: UTC+8 (China Standard)
- Postal code: 417603
- Area code: 0738

Luguan Town (simplified Chinese: 炉观镇; traditional Chinese: 爐觀鎮; pinyin: Lúguàn zhèn) is an urban town in and subdivision of Xinhua County, Hunan Province, People's Republic of China.

== Administrative divisions ==
The town is divided into 60 villages and three communities, which include the following areas:

- Luguang Community
- Lukuangyisanjing Community
- Lukuangerjing Community
- Bijia Village
- Xiniu Village
- Suyuan Village
- Luguan Village
- Shiping Village
- Hengling Village
- Shantang Village
- Bai'e Village
- Sili Village
- Changsheng Village
- Changtian Village
- Tiaoshi Village
- Shixi Village
- Shiyan Village
- Longshan Village
- Changtang Village
- Qiangxiang Village
- Qingjiashan Village
- Daxin Village
- Qinggang Village
- Taiyangqiao Village
- Kouqian Village
- Yantang'ao Village
- Yuegong Village
- Shajinglong Village
- Renqutang Village
- Pingjiang Village
- Jiulong Village
- Nongke Village
- Langshan Village
- Yunxi Village
- Wanshouqiao Village
- Qingshui Village
- Yanshan Village
- Hejia Village
- Xiaotian Village
- Zhongtian Village
- Shuangjiang Village
- Zhixi Village
- Lijiawan Village
- Xiaojinxi Village
- Linchong Village
- Hengshanxi Village
- Jin'e Village
- Leixi Village
- Jiuping Village
- Jiangkou Village
- Xinrong Village
- Meishu Village
- Xinghua Village
- Maociyuan Village
- Tianxin Village
- Putao Village
- Shixin Village
- Sanjiang Village
- Jintan Village
- Jinjun Village
- Longzhua Village
- Yongxing Village
- Heye Village
