= Anhua County =

Anhua County 安化县 Anhwa
- County
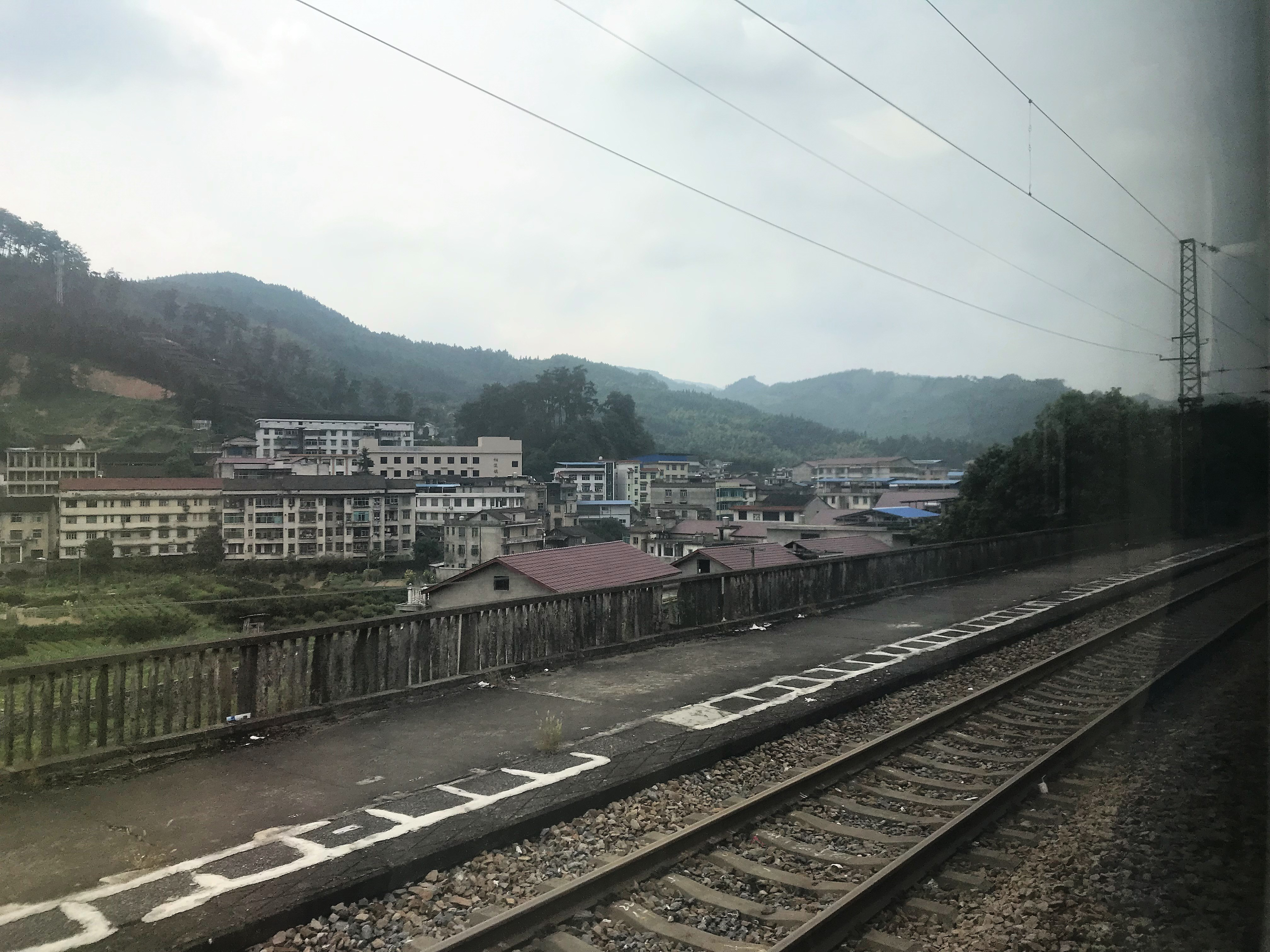

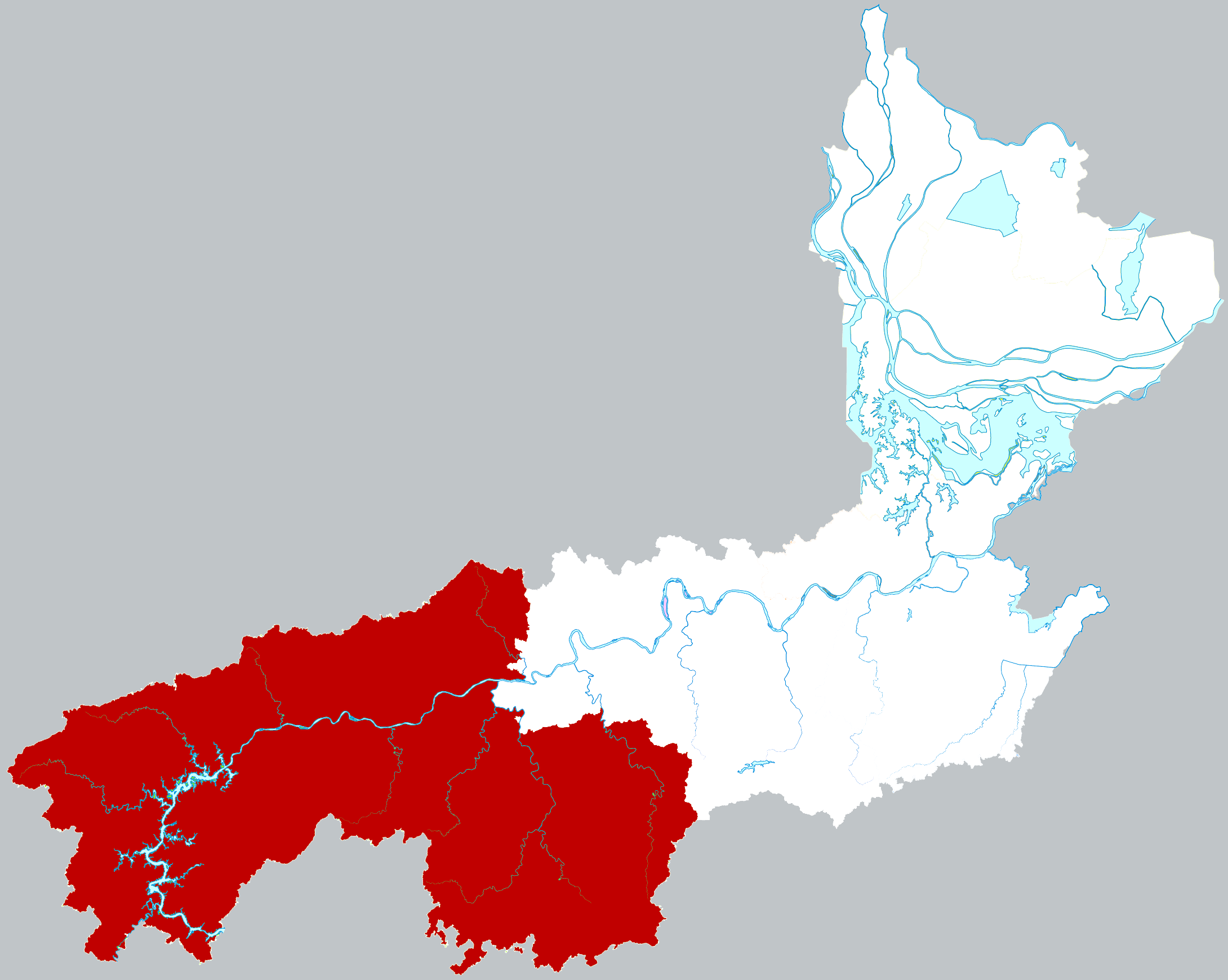
- Location of Anhua County within Yiyang

- Location of the seat in Hunan
- Coordinates: 28°18′25″N 111°21′14″E
- Country: People's Republic of China
- Province: Hunan
- Prefecture-level city: Yiyang

Area
  - Total: 4,945.2 km^{2} (1,909.4 sq mi)

Population
  - Total: 780,900
  - Density: 157.9/km^{2} (409.0/sq mi)
- Time zone: UTC+8 (China Standard)
- Postal code: 413500

Anhua County (simplified Chinese: 安化县; traditional Chinese: 安化縣; pinyin: Ānhuà Xiàn) is a county in the Province of Hunan, China. It is under the administration of Yiyang Prefecture-level City.

Located in the north-central part of the province, the county is bordered to the north by Dingcheng District of Changde City and Taoyuan County, to the east by Taojiang and Ningxiang Counties, to the south by Lianyuan City and Xinhua County, and to the west by Xupu and Yuanling Counties. Anhua County covers an area of 4,950 km^{2} (1,910 sq mi). As of 2013, it had a registered population of 1,029,000 and a permanent resident population of 912,100. Anhua has 18 towns and 5 townships under its jurisdiction, and the county seat is Dongping (东坪镇).

Anhua County is the source place of Anhua dark tea, which is a kind of dark tea; Anhua was an important nodal point of the Tea Horse Road in ancient times. Anhua is both the southernmost and westernmost county-level division of Yiyang. Anhua and its neighborhood have a very distinct indigenous culture - Meishan culture, which has quite long history and profound religious content, influenced by mainstream Han-Chinese culture and also some neighbor cultures during its developing process.

== Administrative divisions ==
According to the result on adjustment of township-level divisions of Anhua County on February 17, 2006, Anhua County has 18 towns and 5 townships under its jurisdiction. They are:

18 towns

- Changtang (长塘镇)
- Dafu (大福镇): Merging Dongshan Township (东山乡), Building town experimental zone of Xinqiao (新桥建镇试验区) and the former Dafu Town (大福镇) on February 17, 2006.
- Dongping (东坪镇): Merging Muzi Township (木子乡), Yanglin Township (杨林乡) and the former Dongping Town (东坪镇) on February 17, 2006.
- Jiangnan (江南镇): Merging Dongshi Township (洞市乡) and the former Jiangnan Town (江南镇) on February 17, 2006.
- Kuixi (奎溪镇)
- Le'an (乐安镇)
- Lengshi (冷市镇)
- Malu (马路镇): Merging Cangchang Township (苍场乡) and the former Malu Town (马路镇) on February 17, 2006.
- Meicheng (梅城镇): Merging Lilin Township (栗林乡) and the former Meicheng Town (梅城镇) on February 17, 2006.
- Pingkou (平口镇)
- Qingtangpu (清塘铺镇)
- Qujiang (渠江镇)
- Taoxi (滔溪镇)
- Xianxi (仙溪镇)
- Xiaoyan (小淹镇)
- Yangjiaotang (羊角塘镇)
- Yanxi (烟溪镇)
- Zhenxi (柘溪镇)

5 townships

- Gaoming (高明乡)
- Gulou (古楼乡)
- Longtang (龙塘乡)
- Nanjin (南金乡)
- Tianzhuang (田庄乡)

== Climate ==
Climate data for Anhua, elevation 196 m (643 ft), (1991–2020 normals, extremes 1981–present)
Month	Jan	Feb	Mar	Apr	May	Jun	Jul	Aug	Sep	Oct	Nov	Dec	Year
Record high °C (°F)	23.6 (74.5)	30.3 (86.5)	35.0 (95.0)	37.1 (98.8)	36.9 (98.4)	39.3 (102.7)	40.0 (104.0)	40.1 (104.2)	38.9 (102.0)	36.2 (97.2)	30.2 (86.4)	25.2 (77.4)	40.1 (104.2)
Mean daily maximum °C (°F)	8.9 (48.0)	11.6 (52.9)	16.2 (61.2)	22.5 (72.5)	26.9 (80.4)	30.0 (86.0)	33.3 (91.9)	32.8 (91.0)	28.5 (83.3)	22.9 (73.2)	17.5 (63.5)	11.7 (53.1)	21.9 (71.4)
Daily mean °C (°F)	4.8 (40.6)	7.1 (44.8)	11.1 (52.0)	16.7 (62.1)	21.1 (70.0)	24.8 (76.6)	27.6 (81.7)	27.0 (80.6)	22.9 (73.2)	17.4 (63.3)	12.1 (53.8)	7.0 (44.6)	16.6 (61.9)
Mean daily minimum °C (°F)	2.2 (36.0)	4.1 (39.4)	7.7 (45.9)	13.0 (55.4)	17.3 (63.1)	21.3 (70.3)	23.9 (75.0)	23.4 (74.1)	19.5 (67.1)	14.2 (57.6)	8.9 (48.0)	4.0 (39.2)	13.3 (55.9)
Record low °C (°F)	−4.7 (23.5)	−4.5 (23.9)	−2.2 (28.0)	2.3 (36.1)	7.4 (45.3)	10.5 (50.9)	17.8 (64.0)	16.9 (62.4)	12.2 (54.0)	2.5 (36.5)	−2.2 (28.0)	−5.5 (22.1)	−5.5 (22.1)
Average precipitation mm (inches)	77.9 (3.07)	86.5 (3.41)	145.8 (5.74)	198.2 (7.80)	245.9 (9.68)	280.3 (11.04)	228.1 (8.98)	154.6 (6.09)	93.9 (3.70)	97.0 (3.82)	85.9 (3.38)	53.6 (2.11)	1,747.7 (68.82)
Average precipitation days (≥ 0.1 mm)	14.0	14.6	17.1	16.9	17.2	16.5	14.1	12.7	10.7	12.7	11.2	11.9	169.6
Average snowy days	6.2	4.0	1.4	0	0	0	0	0	0	0	0.2	2.4	14.2
Average relative humidity (%)	80	81	81	81	82	84	81	80	81	81	81	79	81
Mean monthly sunshine hours	59.0	59.0	83.7	108.6	129.3	125.0	193.4	178.9	127.7	104.6	92.9	80.3	1,342.4
Percentage possible sunshine	18	19	22	28	31	30	46	44	35	30	29	25	30
Source: China Meteorological Administration
