= Xinhua County =

Xinhua County 新化县
- County
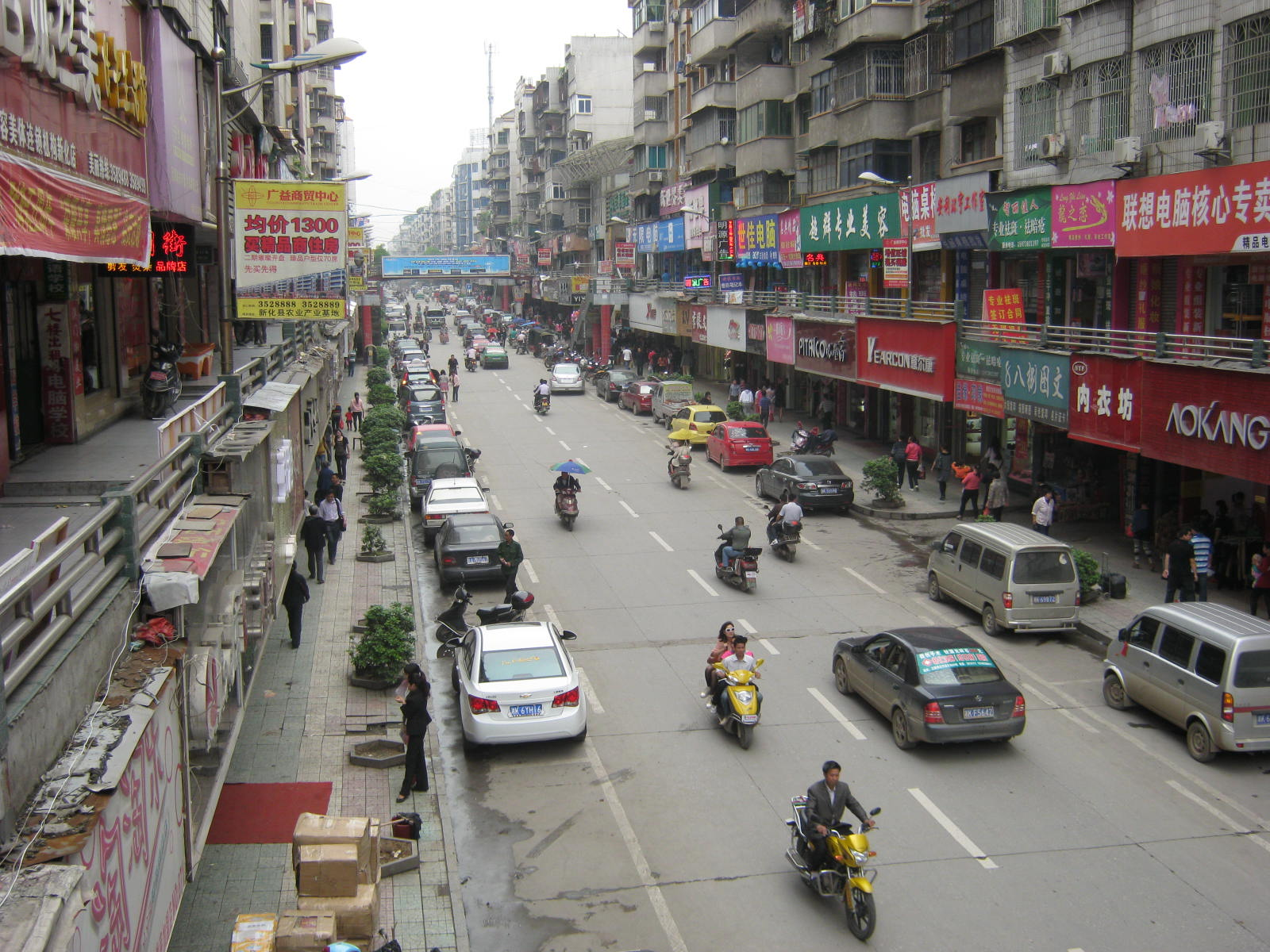
- Tianhua South Road (天华南路)

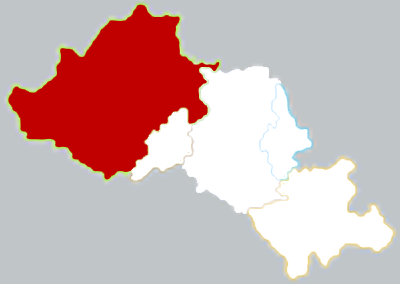
- Location of Xinhua County within Loudi

- Location in Hunan
- Coordinates: 27°44′13″N 111°18′29″E
- Country: People's Republic of China
- Province: Hunan
- Prefecture-level city: Loudi

Area
  - Total: 3,634.98 km^{2} (1,403.47 sq mi)

Population (2010)
  - Total: 1,110,910
  - Density: 305.617/km^{2} (791.543/sq mi)
- Time zone: UTC+8 (China Standard)
- Postal code: 4176XX

Xinhua County (Chinese: 新化县; pinyin: Xīnhuà Xiàn) is a county and the fourth-most populous county-level division in the province of Hunan, China. It is under the administration of Loudi City.

Located along the middle reaches of the Zi River, it covers 3,635 square kilometers and has a population of 1,196,538 (November 2020). Xinhua shares borders with Lengshuijiang, Lianyuan, Xinshao, Xupu and Longhui counties and cities. As a county, it was founded in 1072 (Northern Song dynasty) and is now under jurisdiction of the Loudi City, subdivided into 7 townships and 19 towns, with Shangmei as the county seat.

The economy of Xinhua County is largely agricultural, with 741 thousand of Xinhua County's population of 1.2 million working in agriculture. Other than agriculture, industries include machinery, electronics, ceramics, building materials, metallurgy, coal, chemical, food, paper, bamboo and wood processing. In recent years, Xinhua County's economy has grown quite a lot.

In 2011, media attention was attracted by a construction project started by the county's government. In the hope of attracting tourists, the officials wanted to build a lavish temple (Xiongshan Si - 熊山寺; 'Bear Mountain Temple'), diverting funds from more essential projects.

== Climate ==
Climate data for Xinhua, elevation 212 m (696 ft), (1991–2020 normals, extremes 1981–present)
Month	Jan	Feb	Mar	Apr	May	Jun	Jul	Aug	Sep	Oct	Nov	Dec	Year
Record high °C (°F)	25.7 (78.3)	30.1 (86.2)	33.2 (91.8)	36.1 (97.0)	36.5 (97.7)	37.5 (99.5)	39.1 (102.4)	39.8 (103.6)	38.5 (101.3)	35.7 (96.3)	32.0 (89.6)	24.1 (75.4)	39.8 (103.6)
Mean daily maximum °C (°F)	9.0 (48.2)	11.7 (53.1)	16.2 (61.2)	22.6 (72.7)	26.9 (80.4)	29.8 (85.6)	33.0 (91.4)	32.6 (90.7)	28.7 (83.7)	23.3 (73.9)	17.9 (64.2)	11.9 (53.4)	22.0 (71.5)
Daily mean °C (°F)	5.3 (41.5)	7.7 (45.9)	11.7 (53.1)	17.6 (63.7)	22.0 (71.6)	25.3 (77.5)	28.2 (82.8)	27.4 (81.3)	23.6 (74.5)	18.4 (65.1)	13.0 (55.4)	7.6 (45.7)	17.3 (63.2)
Mean daily minimum °C (°F)	2.8 (37.0)	4.9 (40.8)	8.6 (47.5)	14.0 (57.2)	18.4 (65.1)	22.2 (72.0)	24.7 (76.5)	24.0 (75.2)	20.1 (68.2)	14.9 (58.8)	9.6 (49.3)	4.5 (40.1)	14.1 (57.3)
Record low °C (°F)	−5.8 (21.6)	−3.9 (25.0)	−1.2 (29.8)	3.1 (37.6)	8.4 (47.1)	13.5 (56.3)	17.5 (63.5)	16.8 (62.2)	12.2 (54.0)	3.7 (38.7)	−1.3 (29.7)	−8.5 (16.7)	−8.5 (16.7)
Average precipitation mm (inches)	69.8 (2.75)	74.9 (2.95)	132.0 (5.20)	164.8 (6.49)	203.5 (8.01)	255.9 (10.07)	197.9 (7.79)	142.2 (5.60)	81.2 (3.20)	76.3 (3.00)	73.4 (2.89)	50.5 (1.99)	1,522.4 (59.94)
Average precipitation days (≥ 0.1 mm)	13.8	14.2	17.7	17.3	16.4	16.7	12.8	12.6	9.8	10.4	10.7	11.2	163.6
Average snowy days	6.0	3.0	1.1	0	0	0	0	0	0	0	0.2	2.0	12.3
Average relative humidity (%)	77	77	78	78	78	81	76	77	77	76	76	74	77
Mean monthly sunshine hours	55.7	56.9	76.8	102.8	126.9	124.1	200.6	184.5	135.1	115.6	102.7	84.0	1,365.7
Percentage possible sunshine	17	18	21	27	30	30	48	46	37	33	32	26	30
Source: China Meteorological Administrationall-time April high

== Notable people ==
- He Jiankui, the key figure in the genetically edited human embryo He Jiankui affair was born here.
