= Might-E Truck =

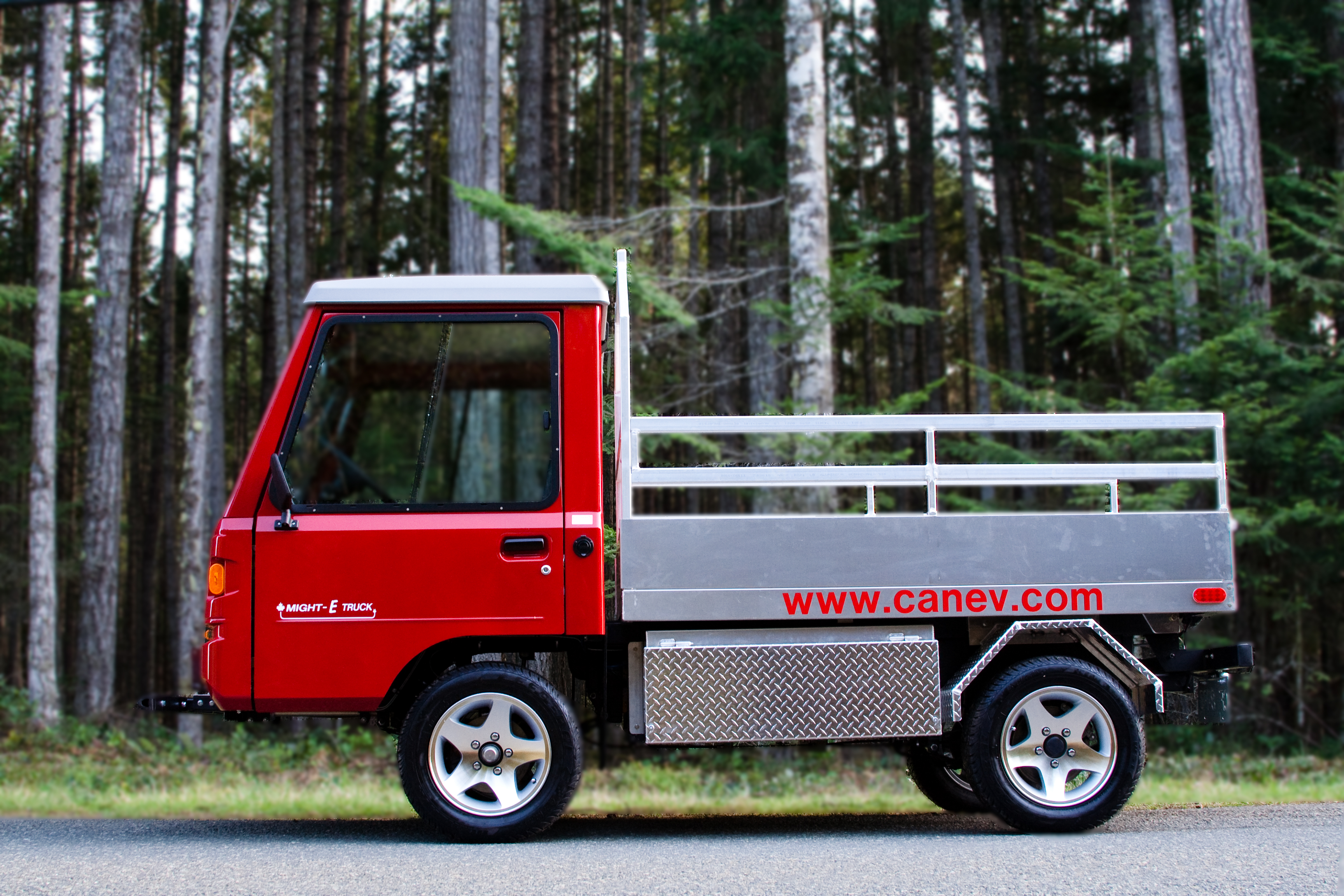

Overview
- Manufacturer: Canadian Electric Vehicles
- Production: 1996–present
- Assembly: Errington, British Columbia, Canada

Body and chassis
- Class: Low Speed Vehicle, Neighborhood Electric Vehicle
- Body style: 2-door truck
- Layout: rear-wheel drive

Powertrain
- Electric motor: 72V 25HP AC
- Transmission: None

Dimensions
- Wheelbase: 72 in (1,830 mm )
- Length: 138 in ( 3,480 mm )
- Width: 53 in ( 1,530 mm )
- Height: 70 in (1,780 mm )
- Curb weight: 2,100 lbs ( 955 kg)

Might-E Truck is a fully electric, mid-sized work vehicle manufactured by Canadian Electric Vehicles in British Columbia, Canada. It is designed for use as a utility, work, urban or leisure vehicle and is manufactured using solely standard North American automotive parts. With a top speed of 40 km/h (25 mph), Might-E Truck is road legal and meets the requirements for a low speed vehicle or neighborhood electric vehicle.

== History ==
The first Might-E Truck model was first designed and built in 1996 by Canadian Electric Vehicles and featured a Direct current electrical system. Since then, physical changes have been made to both the chassis and body. As well, recent improvements in both batteries and electrical systems have resulted in a much more efficient and long lasting unit.

== Components ==
Might-E Truck is powered by 12, 225 amp hour 6 volt, lead acid batteries giving it a range of up to 90 km (56 mi). The batteries supply a 550 amp alternating current controller which then powers a 25 horsepower electric motor. The motor runs directly to the rear gear box and into the rear differential. This enables users without knowledge of standard transmission operation to use the vehicle as well as reduces maintenance.

Generation	Battery	Motor	Generational Improvements
1	Lead Acid	-	-
2	Lead Acid	-	-
3	Sealed Lead Acid; AGM; Lithium	-	Independent Front Suspension, Redesigned Chassis and electrical system

== Features ==
Might-E Truck is manufactured with a heavy duty steel box frame, with spring steel rear and front bumpers. It is upheld by leaf spring suspension with shock absorbers and automotive rack and pinion steering. The cab features left hand drive steering with 2 adjustable seats, an automotive safety glass windshield and a sunroof. Additional optional features include power steering, regenerative brakes and audio systems. The customizable pick up comes with an electromechanical or hydraulic lift and can feature a simple flat deck, box or bucket; or custom assemblies such as garbage disposal or refueling units.
