= Kurrent (disambiguation) =

- Kurrent
- The Kurrent
- Friedrich Kurrent
- Kurent or Korent, the main figure in Kurentovanje, Slovenian carnival
