= Global Electric Motorcars =

American electric vehicle manufacturer

Global Electric Motorcars (GEM)
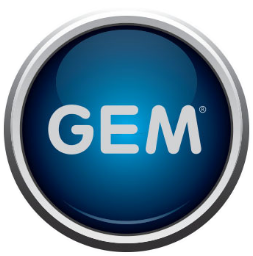
- Type: Subsidiary
- Industry: Automotive
- Founded: 1992; 34 years ago
- Headquarters: Medina, Minnesota, United States
- Area served: Global
- Products: Small vehicles, NEVs, LSVs
- Parent: Waev
- Website: www.gemcar.com

Global Electric Motorcars (GEM) is an American automotive manufacturer specializing in neighborhood electric vehicles (NEVs) since 1998 and low-speed vehicles (LSVs) since 2001. By October 2015 the company had sold over 50,000 GEM Battery electric vehicles worldwide. Originally owned by Chrysler, GEM was acquired by Polaris Inc. in 2011. In January 2022, it became a wholly owned subsidiary of Waev.

== History ==
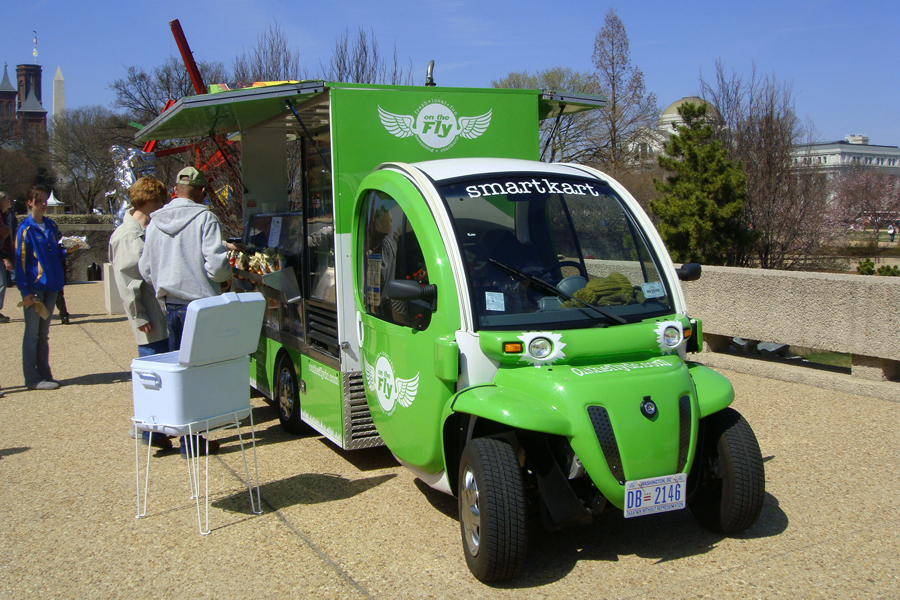
A GEM eLXD used by a street food vendor at the National Mall, Washington, D.C.

The company was founded in 1992 by a team of ex-General Motors engineers from Livonia, Michigan, under the name Trans2.

The company was purchased by a group of North Dakota investors and relocated to Fargo, North Dakota. Global Electric Motorcars manufactured its first vehicle in April 1998, a 48-volt GEM car designed for two passengers with a top speed of 20 mph (32 km/h). Shortly after, the National Highway Traffic Safety Administration (NHTSA) established a new class of motor vehicles, the low-speed vehicle (LSV), also known as the Neighborhood Electric Vehicle (NEV). This classification allowed GEM cars to be driven on public roads, provided they met specific safety criteria such as having safety belts, headlamps, windshield wipers, and safety glass.

GEM battery-electric vehicles are street legal in nearly all 50 US states on public roads with speed limits of 35 mph (56 km/h) or less. With a top speed of 25 mph (40 km/h), GEM cars have a range of 30–100 miles (50–160 km) on a single charge depending on the installed battery technology. They are battery-electric, operating on a 72-volt battery system that can be plugged into a standard 3-prong 120-volt outlet for recharging, and they fully recharge in six to eight hours.

Currently, there are six different models of GEM cars available, GEM cars are utilized by local, state, and national government agencies, resorts, master-planned communities, universities, medical and corporate campuses, as well as by sports teams, taxi-shuttle services, and the general public.

=== Timeline ===
Sources:

- April 1998
  - First GEM car produced in Fargo, North Dakota
- October 1998
  - GEM eL first produced
- November 1998
  - GEM eS first produced
- December 1998
  - GEM e4 first produced
- December 2000
  - DaimlerChrysler Corporation acquires Global Electric Motorcars, LLC
- March 2004
  - 2005 models begin production
- January 2006
  - GEM has 150 dealers
- April 2006
  - GEM e6 first produced
- December 2007
  - Global Electric Motorcars celebrates its 10th Anniversary
  - GEM eL XD first produced
- June 2009
  - Global Electric Motorcars remains a wholly owned subsidiary of Chrysler Group LLC
- June 2010
  - Global Electric Motorcars introduces the new Right Hand Drive GEM electric vehicle
- July 2011
  - Global Electric Motorcars is sold to Polaris
- August 2014
  - GEM receives first minor refresh under new owners Polaris
  - GEM eM1400 utility vehicle first produced
- October 2015
  - GEM eM1400 LSV first produced
- October 2016
  - GEM launches full redesign of e2, e4, e6, & eL XD models including lithium-ion battery offerings

== Vehicles ==
As of October 2015, the GEM neighborhood electric vehicle is the market leader in North America, with global sales of more than 50,000 units since 1998.

- Passenger Vehicles:
  - GEM e2 LSV — A two-passenger vehicle
  - GEM e4 LSV — A four-passenger vehicle
  - GEM e6 LSV — A six-passenger vehicle
- Utility Vehicles:
  - GEM eL XD LSV— A heavier duty version of the GEM with a 70 in × 48 in (1,780 mm × 1,220 mm) bed, which comes in several different configurations, and a 1,100 lb (500 kg) cargo capacity.
  - GEM eM1400 LSV— A heavy duty GEM based on the Polaris ranger with a 51 in × 42 in (1,295 mm × 1,065 mm) bed with a 1,400 lb (635 kg) payload capacity.

== Gallery ==
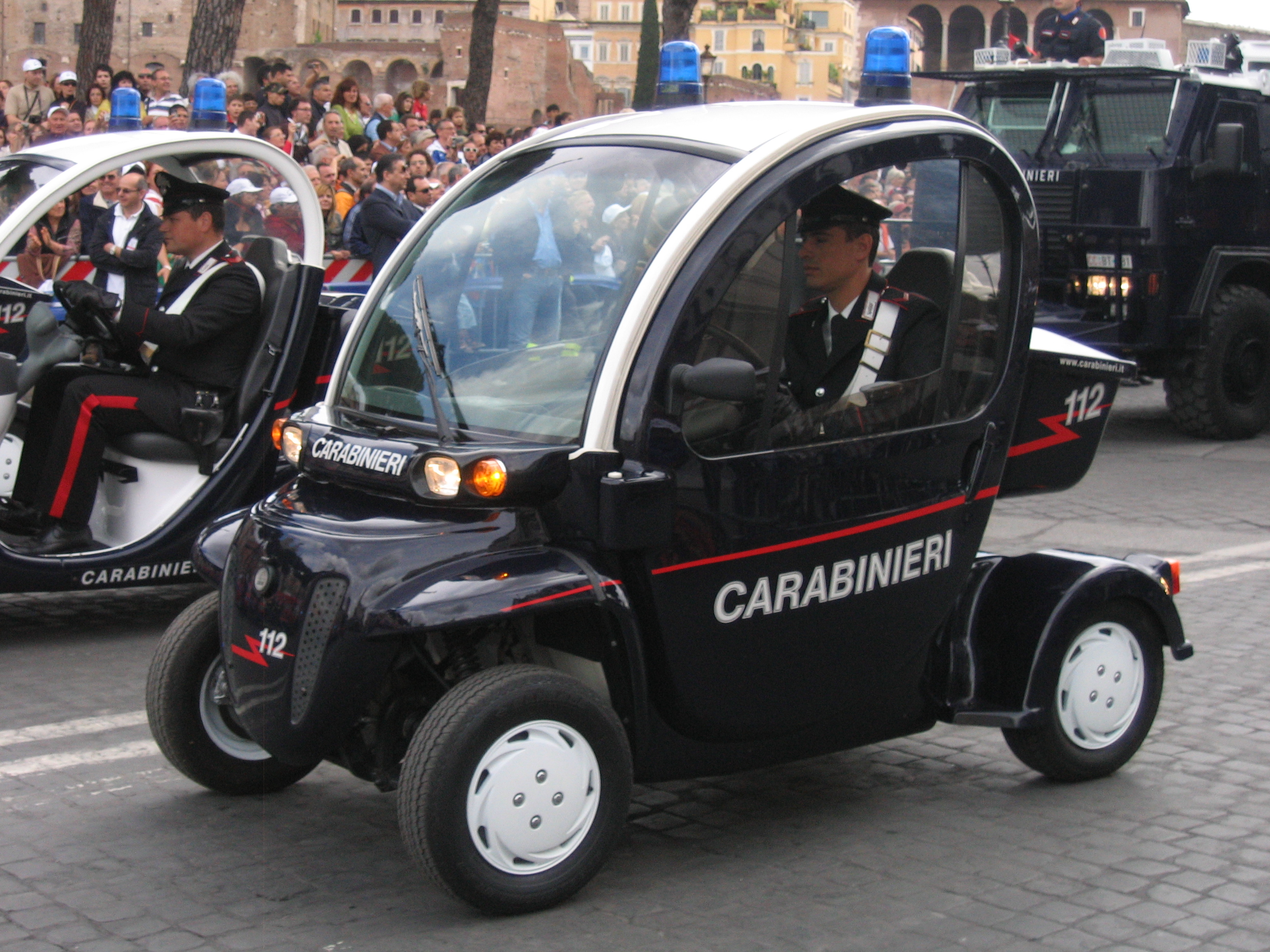

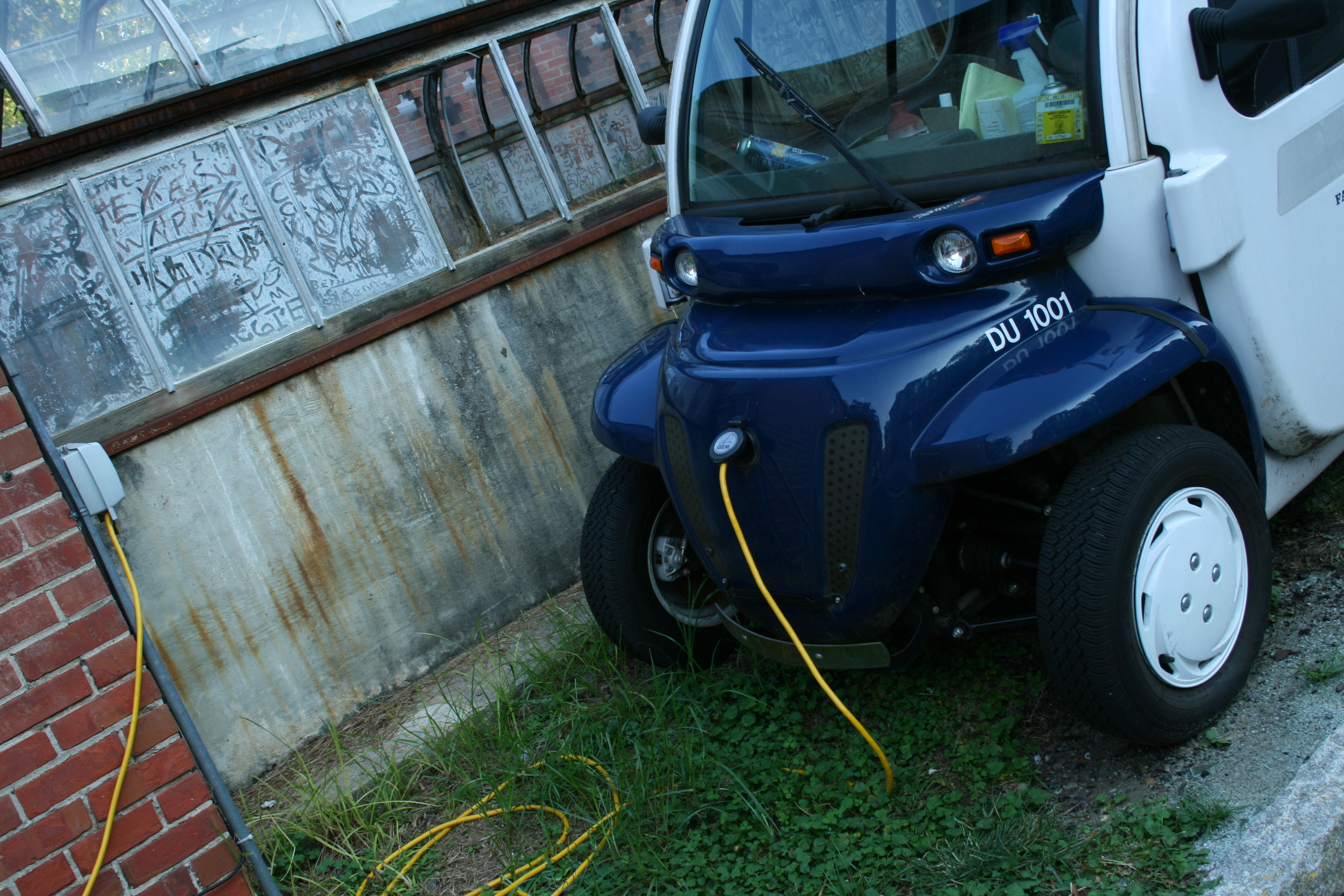

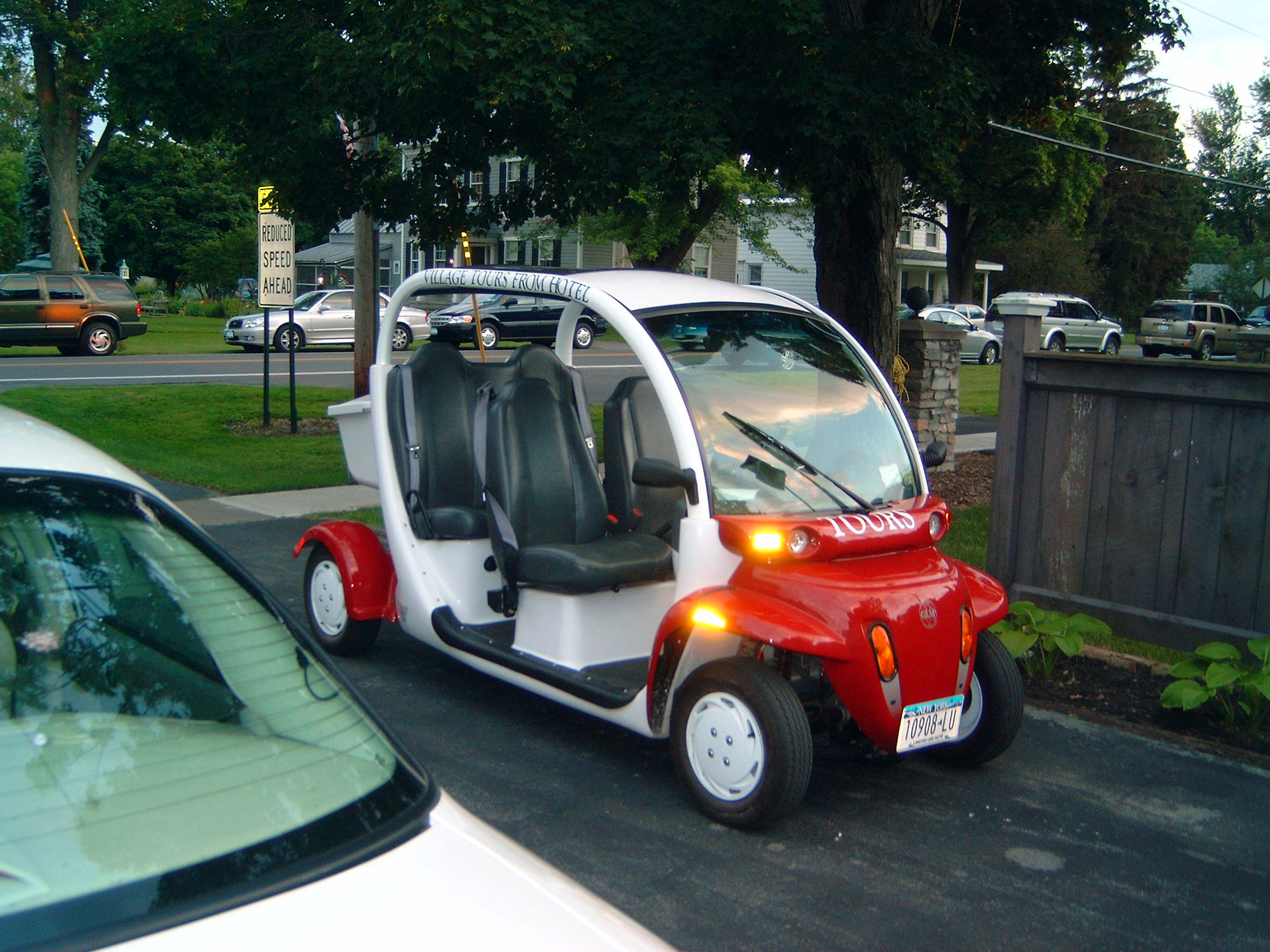

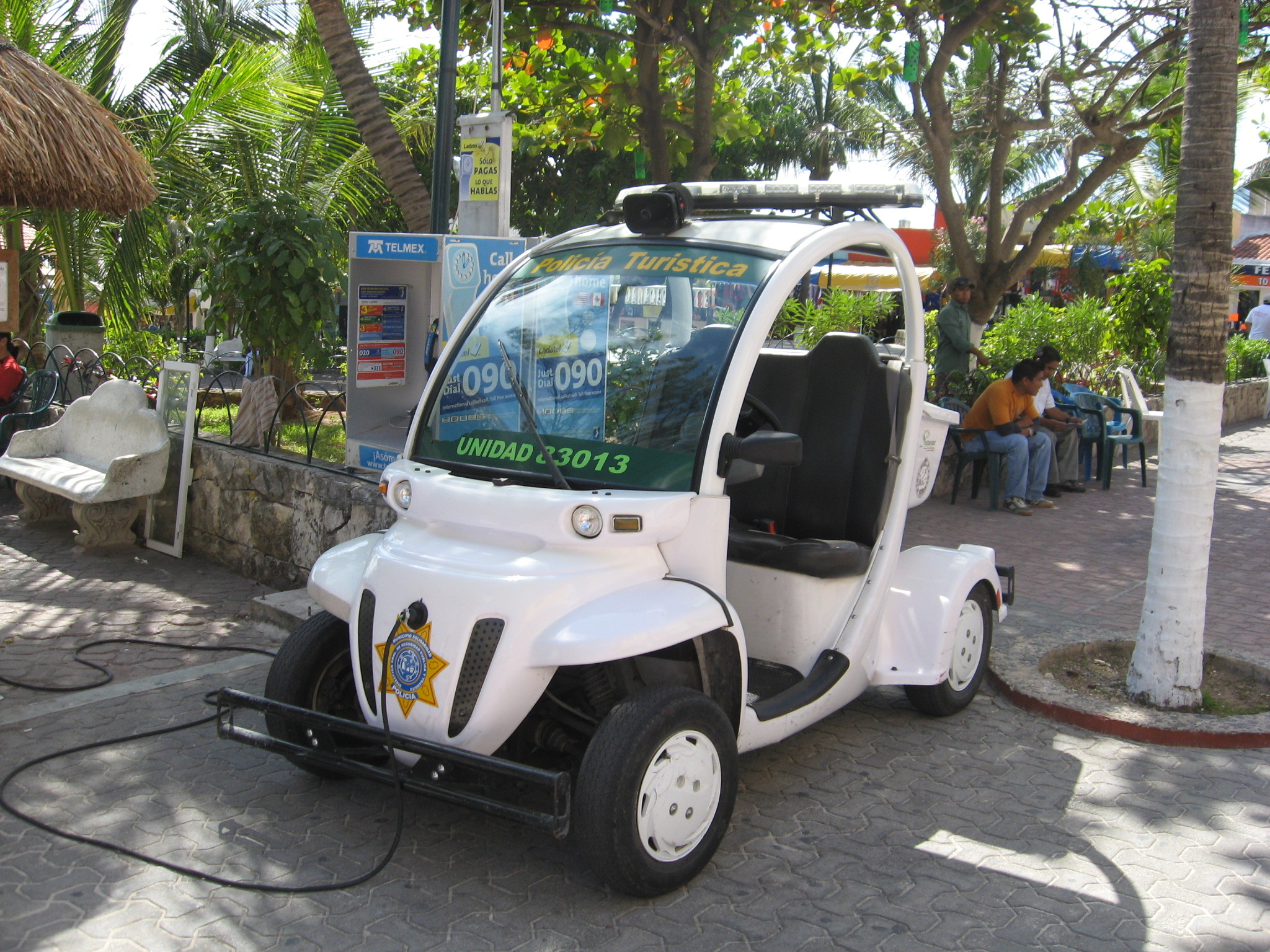

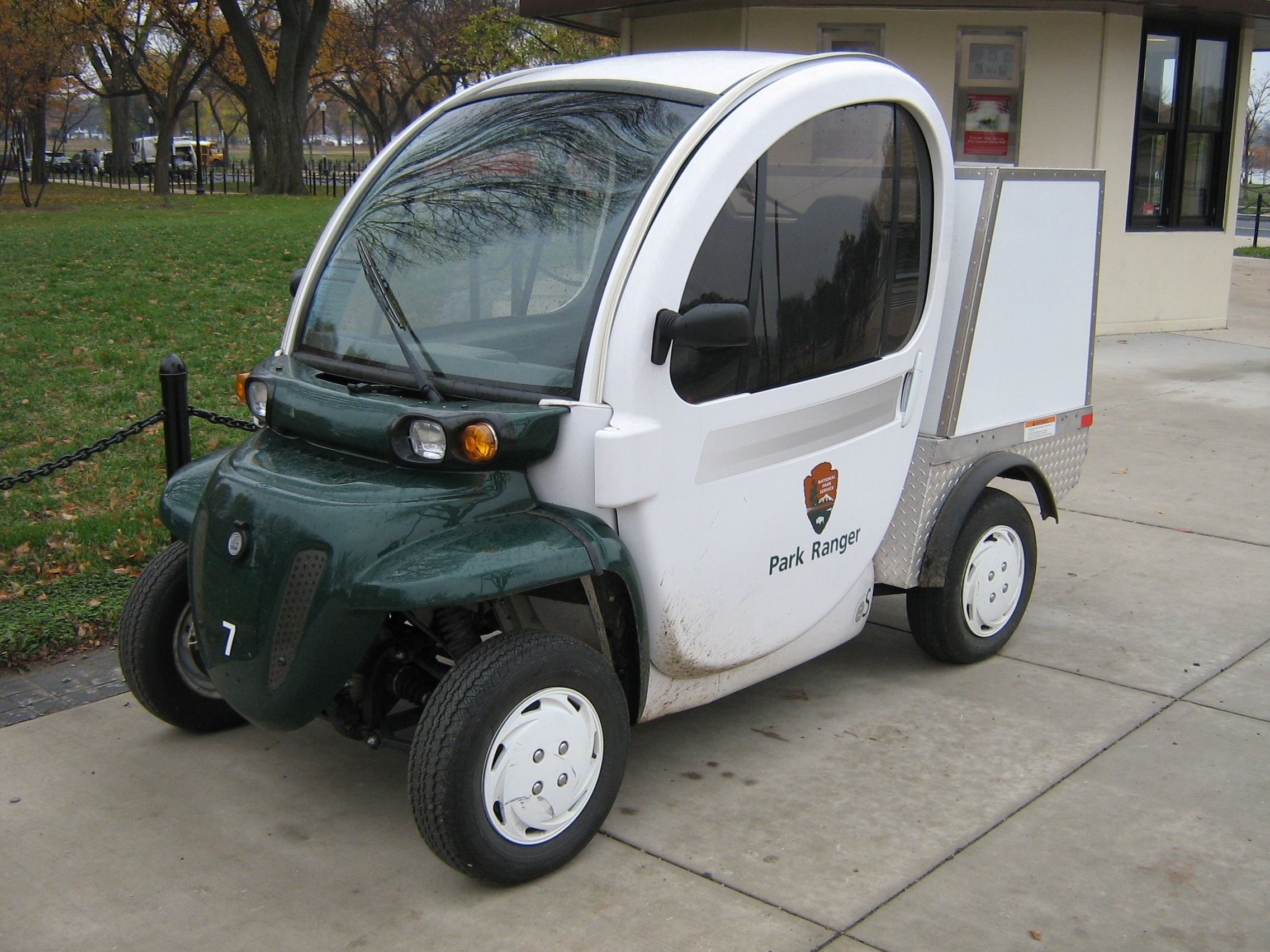

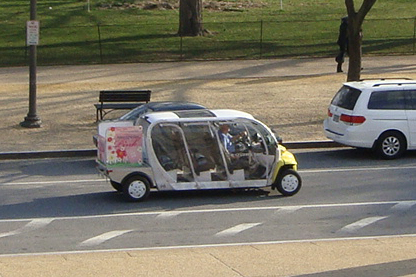

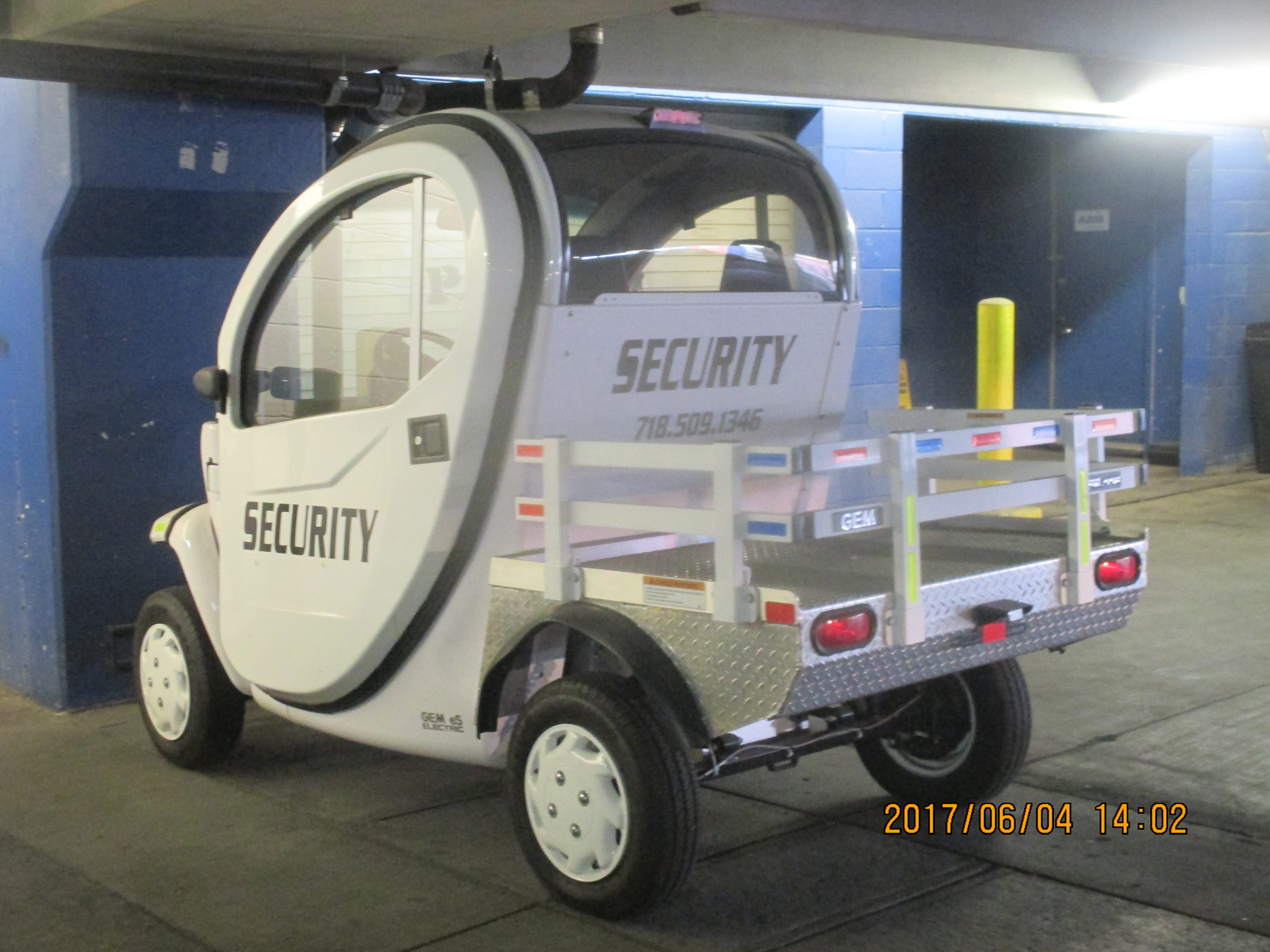
