= Neighborhood electric vehicle =

US category of microcar

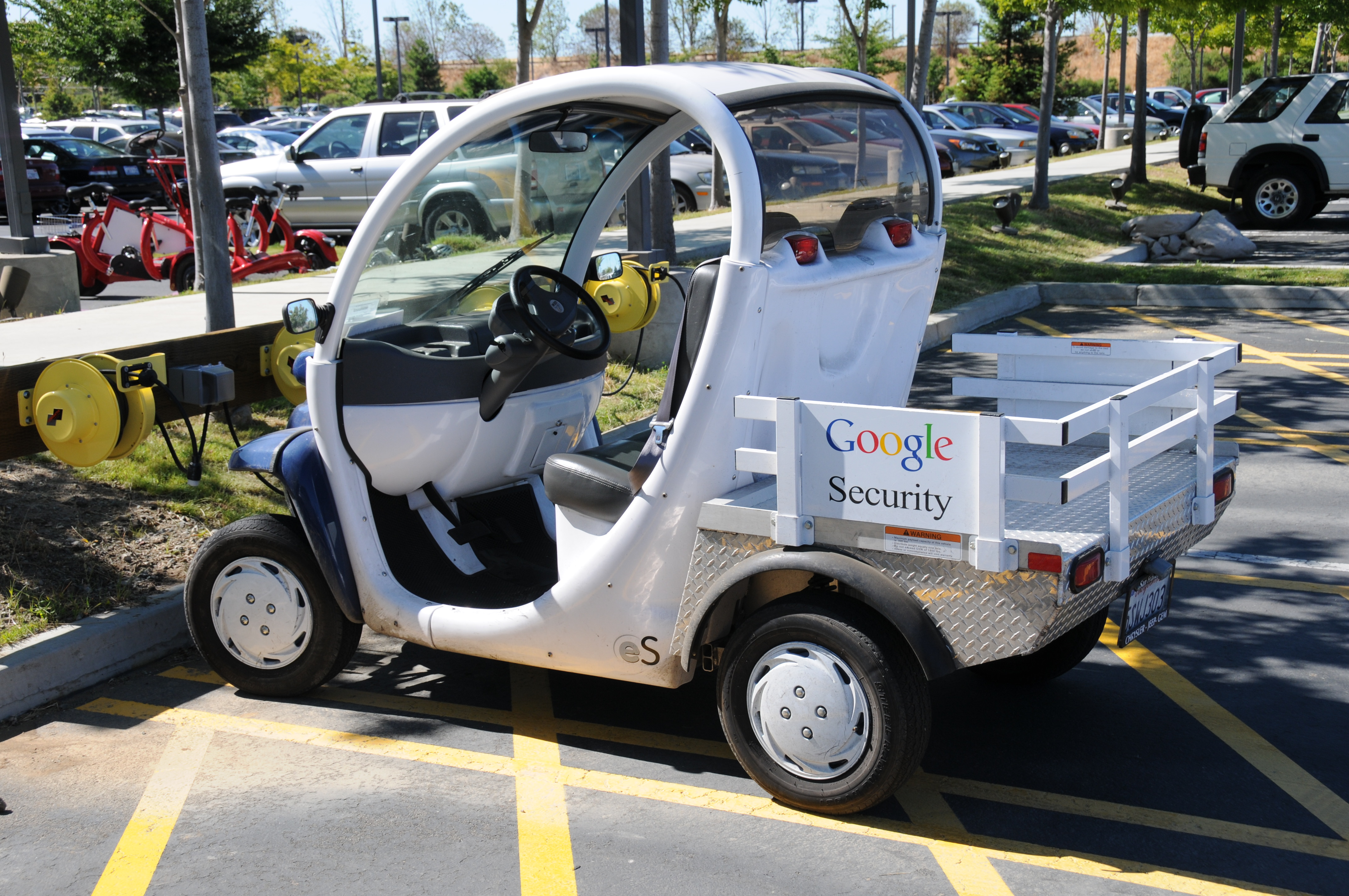
Global Electric Motorcars (GEM) on duty as security car at Googleplex, Mountain View, California

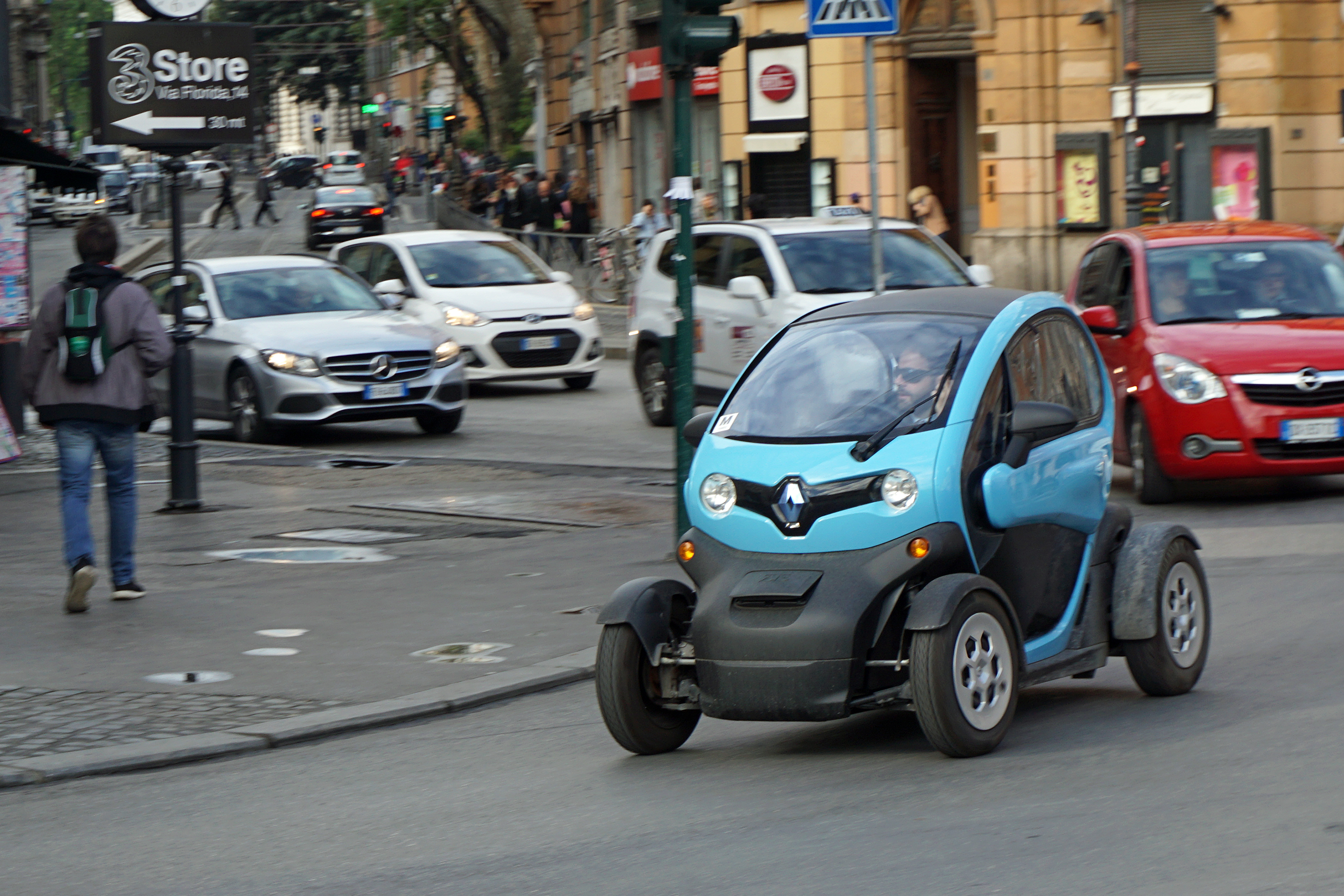
Renault Twizy heavy quadricycle in downtown Rome

A neighborhood electric vehicle (NEV) is an American category for battery electric vehicles that are usually built to have a top speed of 25 miles per hour (40 km/h), and have a maximum loaded weight of 3,000 lb (1,400 kg). The term, neighborhood electric vehicle, was coined by entrepreneur and designer Dan Sturges in 1992. Depending on the particular laws of the state, they are legally limited to roads with posted speed limits of 35 miles per hour (56 km/h) or less (in some states 45 mph or less). NEVs fall under the United States Department of Transportation classification for low-speed vehicles. The non-electric version of a neighborhood electric vehicle is a motorized quadricycle.

An NEV battery pack recharges by plugging into a standard electrical outlet and because it is an all-electric vehicle it emits no tailpipe exhaust. In the state of California NEVs are classified by the California Air Resources Board (CARB) as zero-emissions vehicles (ZEV) and are eligible for a purchase rebate of up to $1,500 if purchased or leased on or after March 15, 2010.

As of June 2014, the Global Electric Motorcars (GEM) neighborhood electric vehicle was the market leader in North America, with global sales of more than 50,000 units since 1998. Another top selling NEV is the Renault Twizy, launched in March 2012, it was the top-selling plug-in electric vehicle in Europe during 2012, and the heavy quadricycle has sold almost 22,000 units through December 2018.

Sales of low-speed small electric cars (LSEVs) experienced considerable growth in China between 2012 and 2015 due to their affordability and flexibility. A total of 200,000 low-speed small electric cars were sold in China in 2013, most of which are powered by lead–acid batteries. In 2015, sales rose to 750,000 units, and to 1.2 million in 2016. As of December 2016, the stock of LSEVs was estimated to be between 3 million and 4 million units. About 1.4 million low-speed electric vehicles were sold in 2018.

== U.S. regulations ==
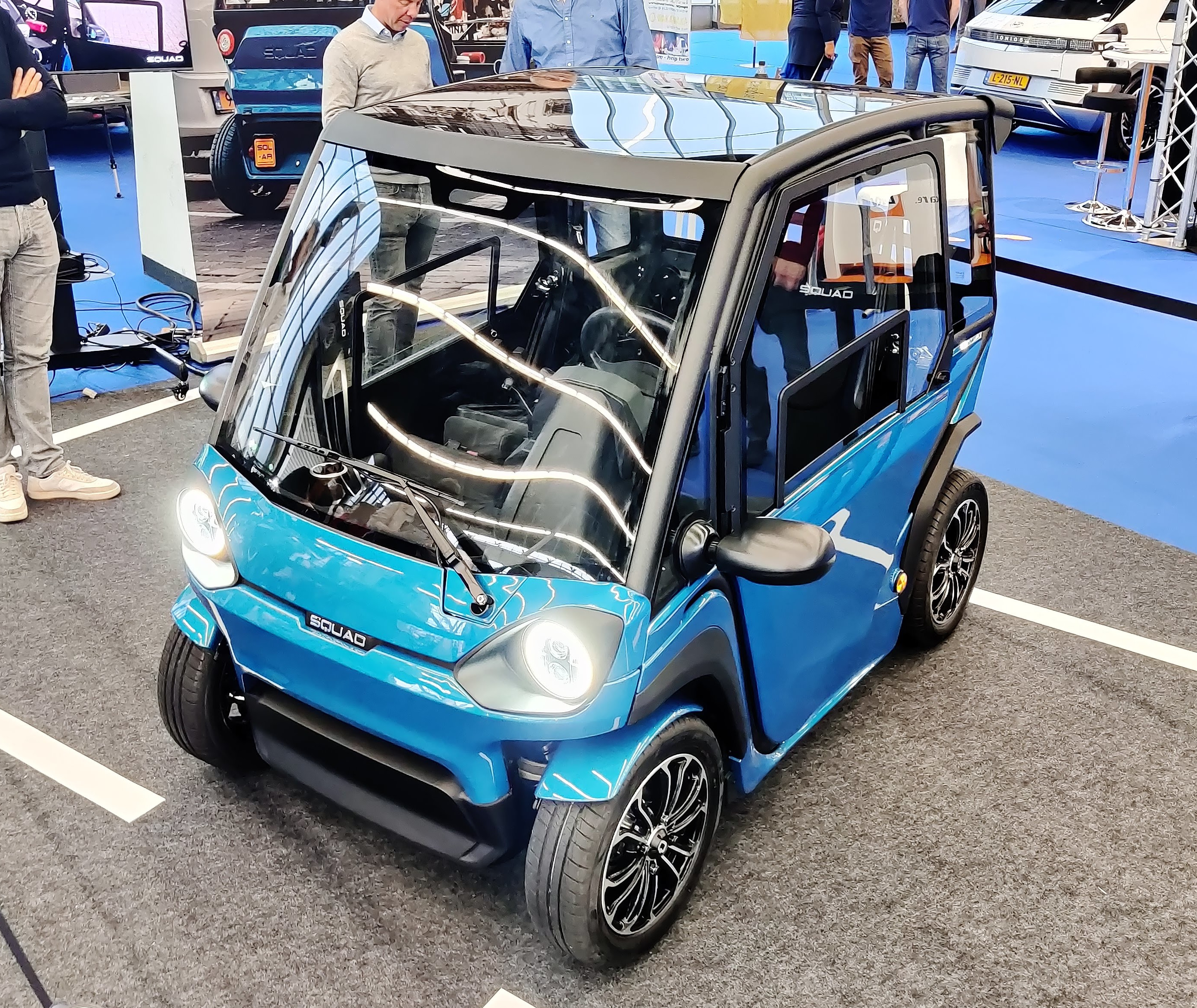
The top of the Squad Solar is a solar panel to add extra range to the vehicle.

Low-speed vehicle is a federally approved street-legal vehicle classification which came into existence in 1998 under Federal Motor Vehicle Safety Standard 500 (FMVSS 500). There is nothing in the federal regulations specifically pertaining to the powertrain.

Low-speed vehicles are defined as a four-wheeled motor vehicle that has a gross vehicle weight rating of less than 3,000 pounds (1,400 kg) and a top speed of between 20 and 25 mph (32 and 40 km/h). Those states that authorize NEVs generally restrict their operation to streets with a maximum speed limit of 35 or 45 mph (56 or 72 km/h). Because of federal law, car dealers cannot legally sell the vehicles to go faster than 25 mph (40 km/h), but the buyer can easily modify the car to go 35 mph (56 km/h). However, if modified to exceed 25 mph (40 km/h), the vehicle then becomes subject to safety requirements of passenger cars.

These speed restrictions, combined with a typical driving range of 30 miles (48 km) per charge and a typical three-year battery durability, are required because of a lack of federally mandated safety equipment and features which NEVs cannot accommodate because of their design. To satisfy federal safety requirements for manufacturers, NEVs must be equipped with three-point seat belts or a lap belt, running lights, headlights, brake lights, reflectors, rear view mirrors, and turn signals. Windshield wipers are not required. In many cases, doors may be optional, crash protection from other vehicles is partially met compared to other non-motorized transport such as bicycles because of the use of seat belts.

=== State regulations ===
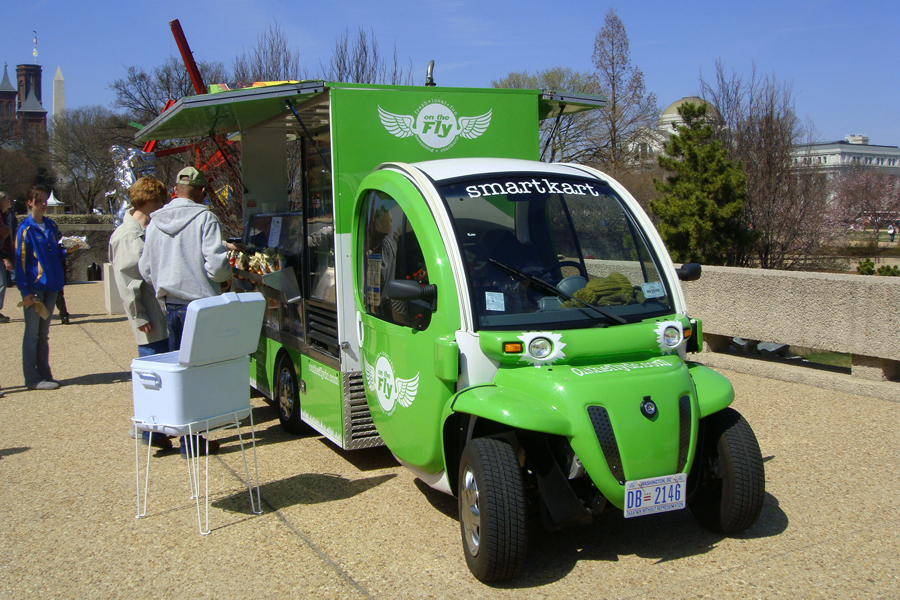
A GEM xLXD NEV used by a street food vendor at the National Mall, Washington, D.C.

Regulations for operating an NEV vary by state. The federal government allows state and local governments to add additional safety requirements beyond those of Title 49 Part 571.500. For instance, the State of New York requires additional safety equipment to include windshield wipers, window defroster, speedometer, odometer and a back-up light. Generally, they must be titled and registered, and the driver must be licensed. Because airbags are not required the NEV cannot normally travel on highways or freeways.

NEVs in many states are restricted to roads with a speed limit of 35 mph (56 km/h) or less. As of February 2012, NEVs are street-legal in 46 states. In Ohio, NEVs are classified as "low-speed vehicles", as opposed to golf carts, which are "under-speed vehicles".

== Community design ==
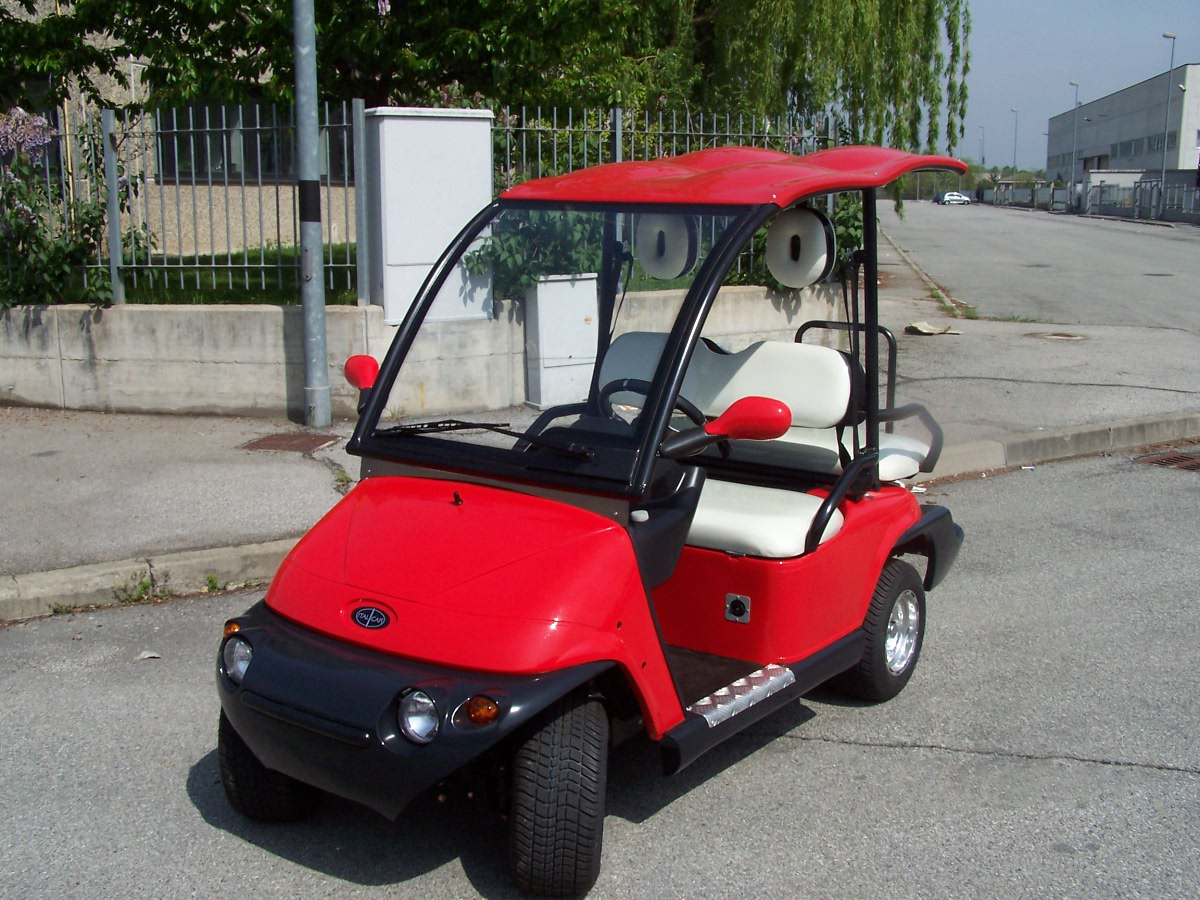
An Italcar EV

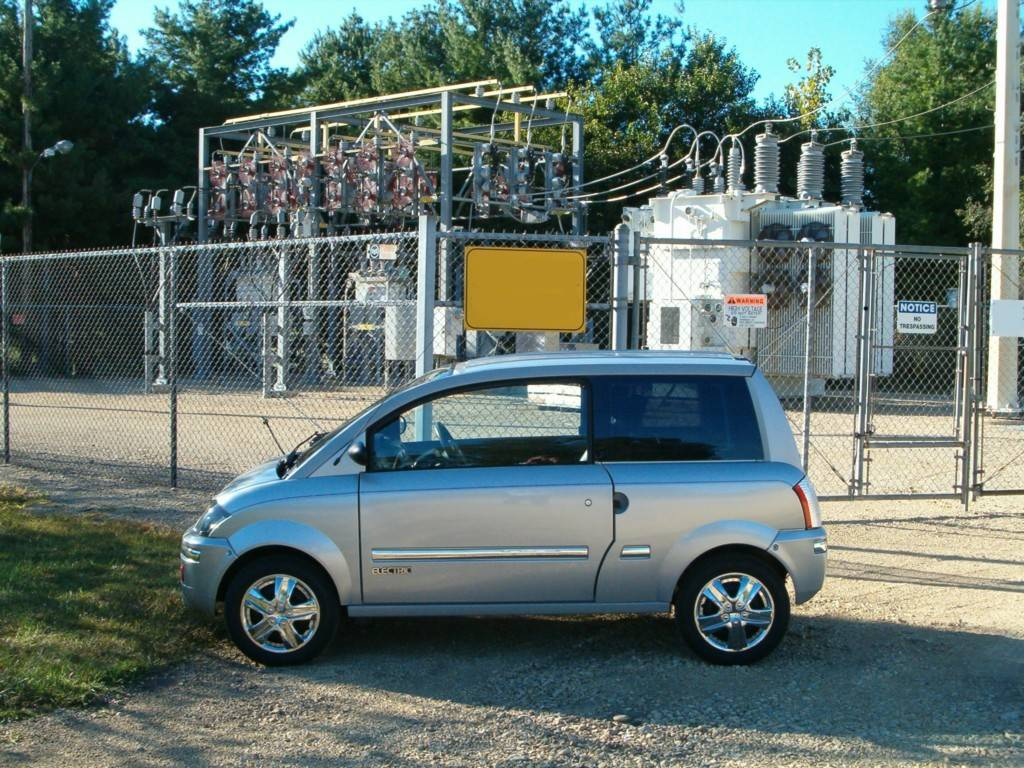
2007 ZENN 2.22 NEV

Some communities are designed to separate neighborhoods from commercial and other areas, connecting them with relatively high speed thoroughfares on which NEVs cannot go, legally or safely. As a result, these vehicles are most common in communities that provide separate routes for them or generally accommodate slow speed traffic.

Communities designed specifically with NEVs and similarly sized vehicles in mind include:

- Avalon, California
- Celebration, Florida
- Lady Lake, Florida
- The Villages, Florida
- Peachtree City, Georgia

Other cities and communities that have adopted NEV-friendly ordinances or have experienced a significant increase of them and street-legal golf cars since 1990 include:

- Alameda, California
- Put-in-Bay, Ohio
- Venice Beach, Los Angeles, California
- Lincoln, California
- Palm Desert, California
- Sun City, Arizona
- Charleston, South Carolina
- Myrtle Beach, South Carolina
- Coronado, California
- Dunedin, Florida

== Sales ==
US and Europe

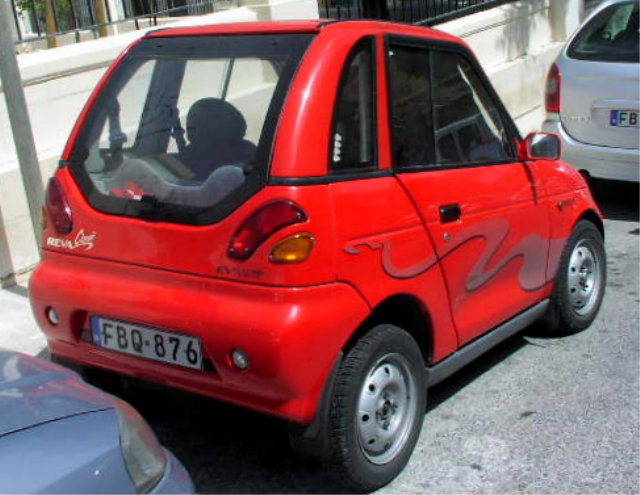
The Indian REVAi 2 door is commercialized as a NEV in the U.S. and as a quadricycle in Europe.

As of July 2006, there were between 60,000 and 76,000 low-speed battery-powered vehicles in use in the United States, up from about 56,000 in 2004. Pike Research estimated there were 478,771 NEVs on the world roads in 2011. The two largest NEV markets in 2011 were the United States, with 14,737 units sold, and France, with 2,231 units.

The different variants of the REVAi, available in 26 countries, sold about 4,600 vehicles worldwide by late 2013, with India and the UK as the main markets. As of October 2015, the GEM neighborhood electric vehicle was the market leader in North America, with global sales of more than 50,000 units since 1998. Another top selling NEV is the Renault Twizy heavy quadricycle, launched in March 2012, with global sales of 15,000 units through April 2015. The Twizy was the top-selling plug-in electric vehicle in Europe during 2012. As of December 2016, a total of 18,592 units had been sold in Europe, representing 96.1% of global sales. Global sales since inception totaled 21,874 units through December 2018.

China

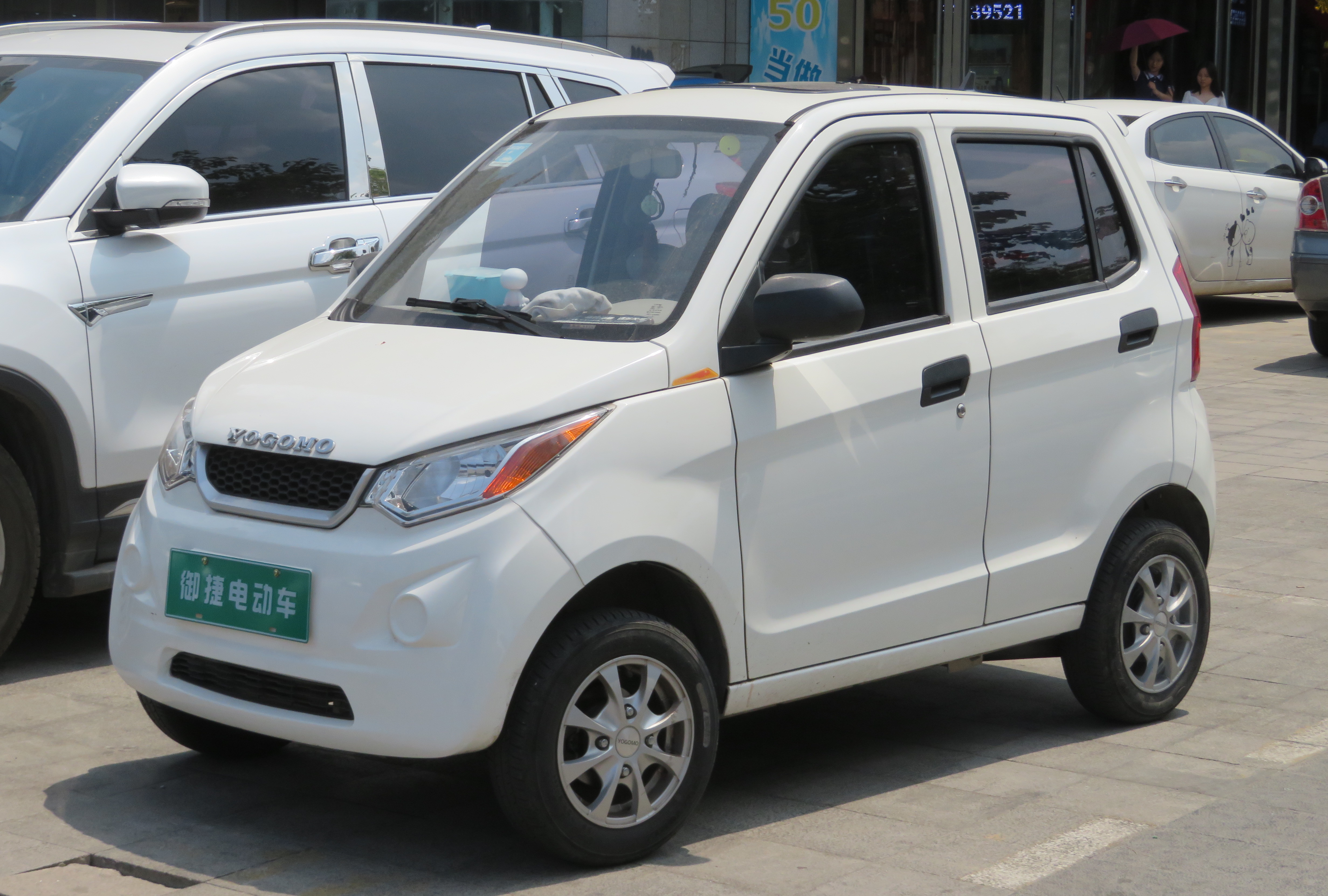
Yogomo low-speed electric car in Luoyang, China

Sales of low-speed small electric cars experienced considerable growth in China between 2012 and 2015 due to their affordability and flexibility because they can be driven without a driver license. Most of these small electric cars are popular in small cities, but they are expanding to larger cities. A total of 200,000 low-speed small electric cars were sold in China in 2013, most of which are powered by lead–acid batteries. These electric vehicles not considered by the government as new energy vehicles due to safety and environmental concerns, and consequently, do not enjoy the same purchase benefits as highway legal plug-in electric cars.

In 2015, sales of low-speed small electric passenger vehicles in China totaled 750,000 units, and 1.2 million in 2016. As of December 2016, the stock of low-speed small electric car was estimated to be between 3 million and 4 million units. However, the sales ratio between LSEVs and passenger NEVs began to decrease beginning in 2015. In 2014, LSEVs sales were 15 times more than normal plug-in passenger cars, but the ratio declined to about four times in 2016, and fell to 2.5 times in 2018, when about 1.1 million normal passenger electric vehicles, compared to 1.4 million low-speed vehicles.

== Examples ==
- Bombardier Class E
- BugE
- Citroën Ami
- CT&T
- Estrima Birò
- Global Electric Motorcars (GEM)
- The Kurrent
- Ligier EZ-10 EasyMile
- Mia electric
- Might-E Truck
- Miles Automotive Group
- MIT Car
- Moke America eMoke
- Personal Urban Mobility and Accessibility (proposed)
- Polaris Ranger EV LSV
- Renault Twizy
- REVAi
- Simolo Customs Ltd.
- Squad Solar
- Trikke Trikke Pon-e 48v UPT
- Xtreme Green Products
- XEV Yoyo
- ZAP Xebra Zap Xebra (2006 - 2010)(Models SD & Truck)
- ZENN (Feel Good Cars)

== Gallery ==
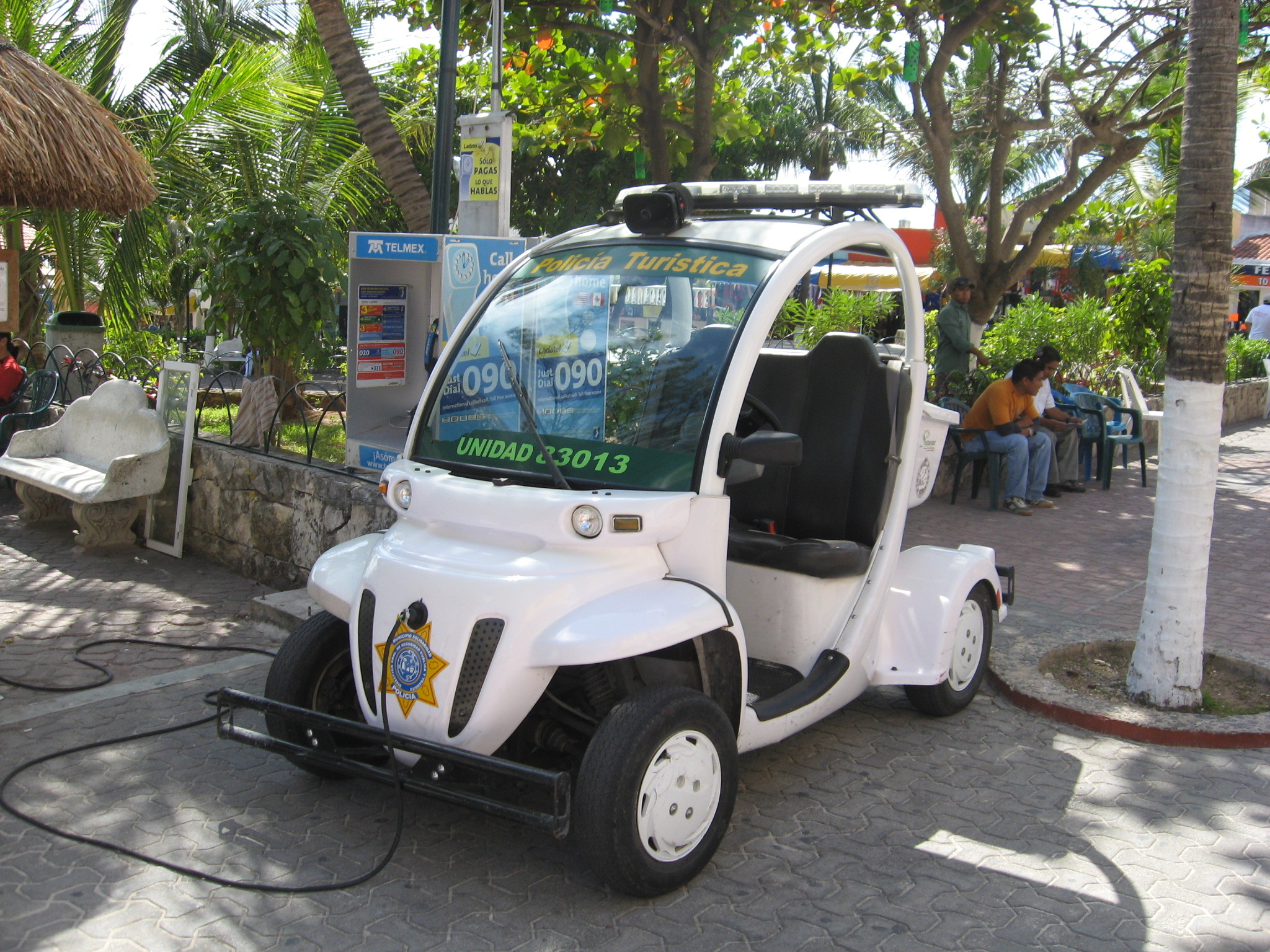
A GEM e2 used by the Tourist Police in Playa del Carmen, Mexico, being recharged

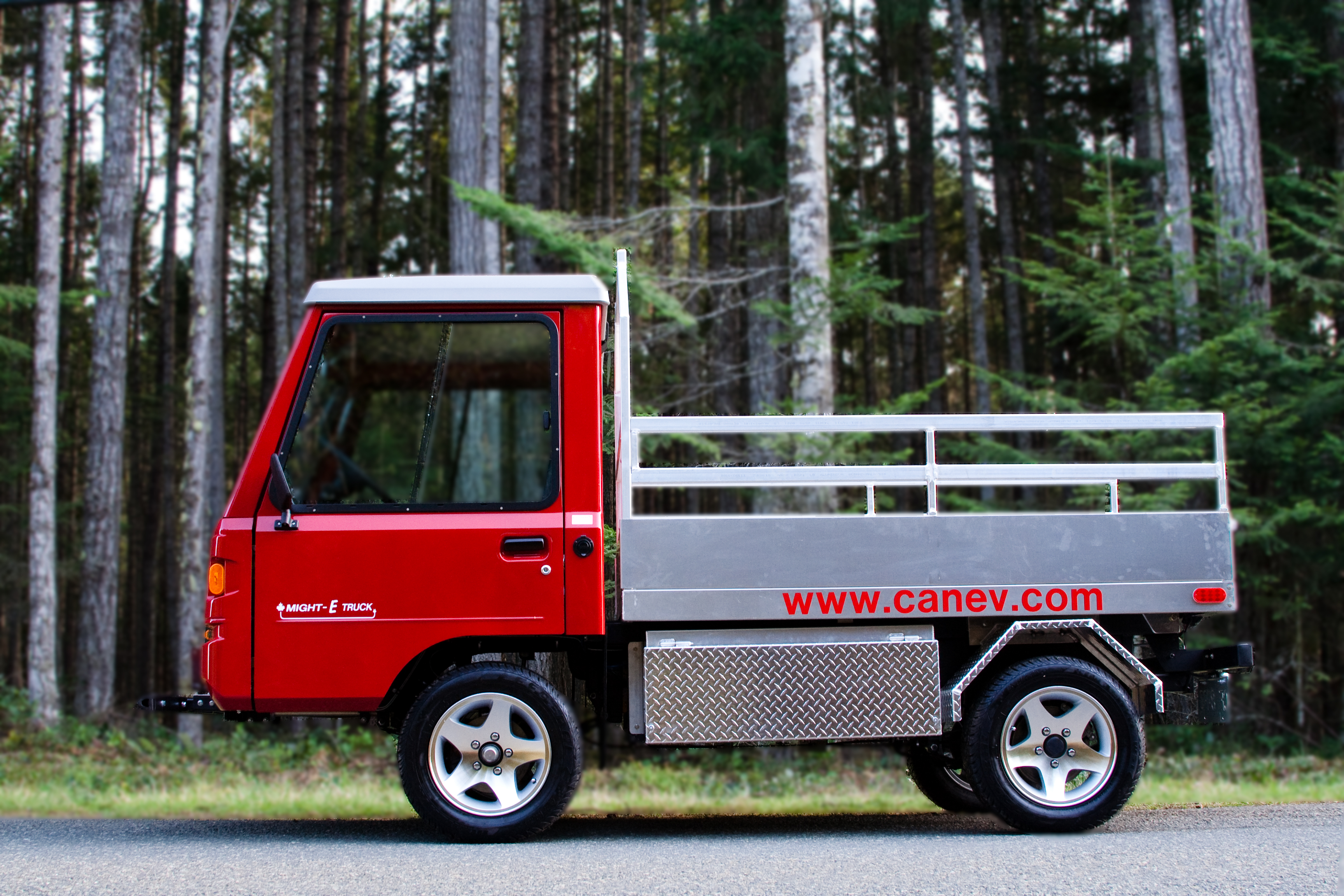
Might-E Truck from Canadian Electric Vehicles

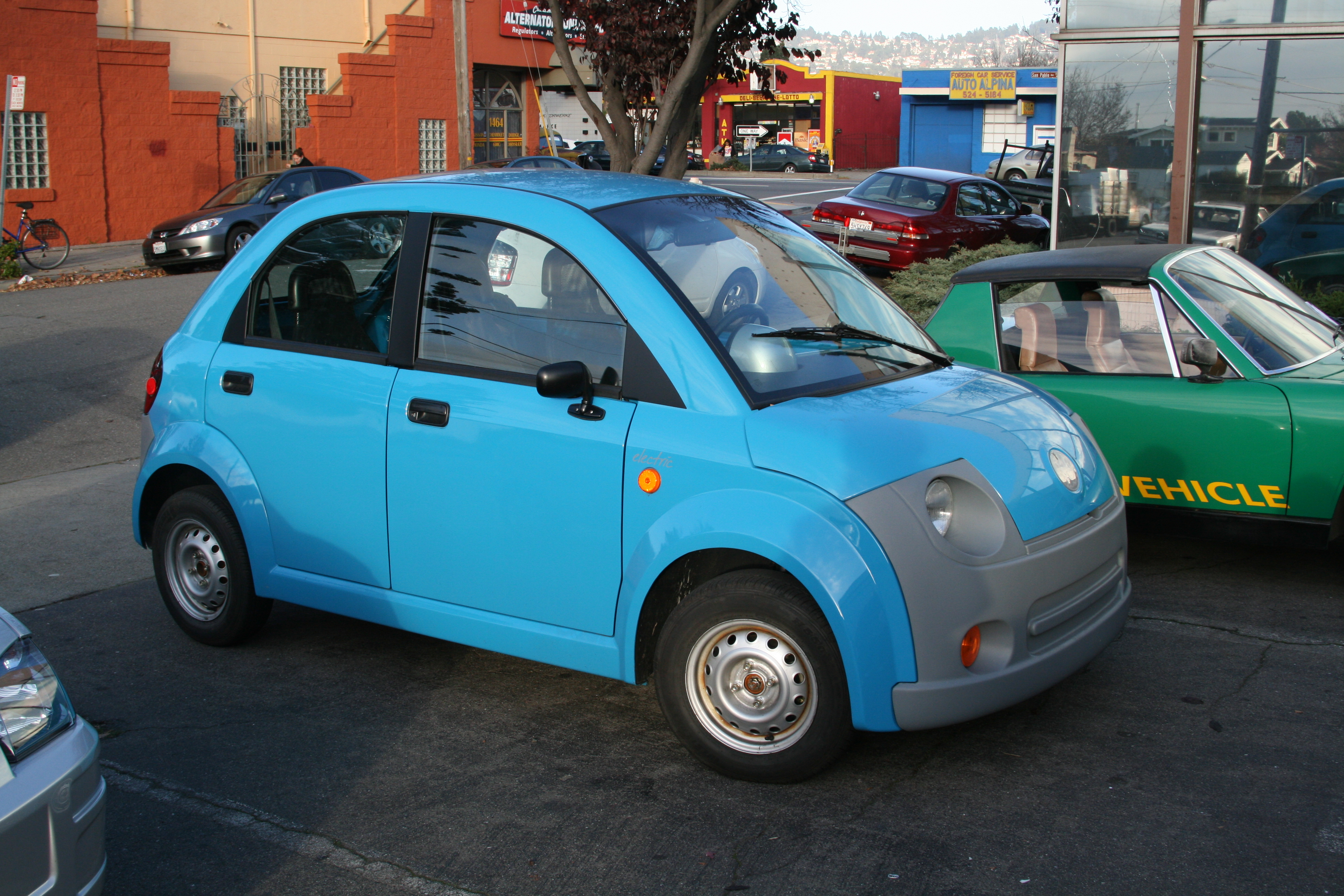
NEV from Dynasty IT

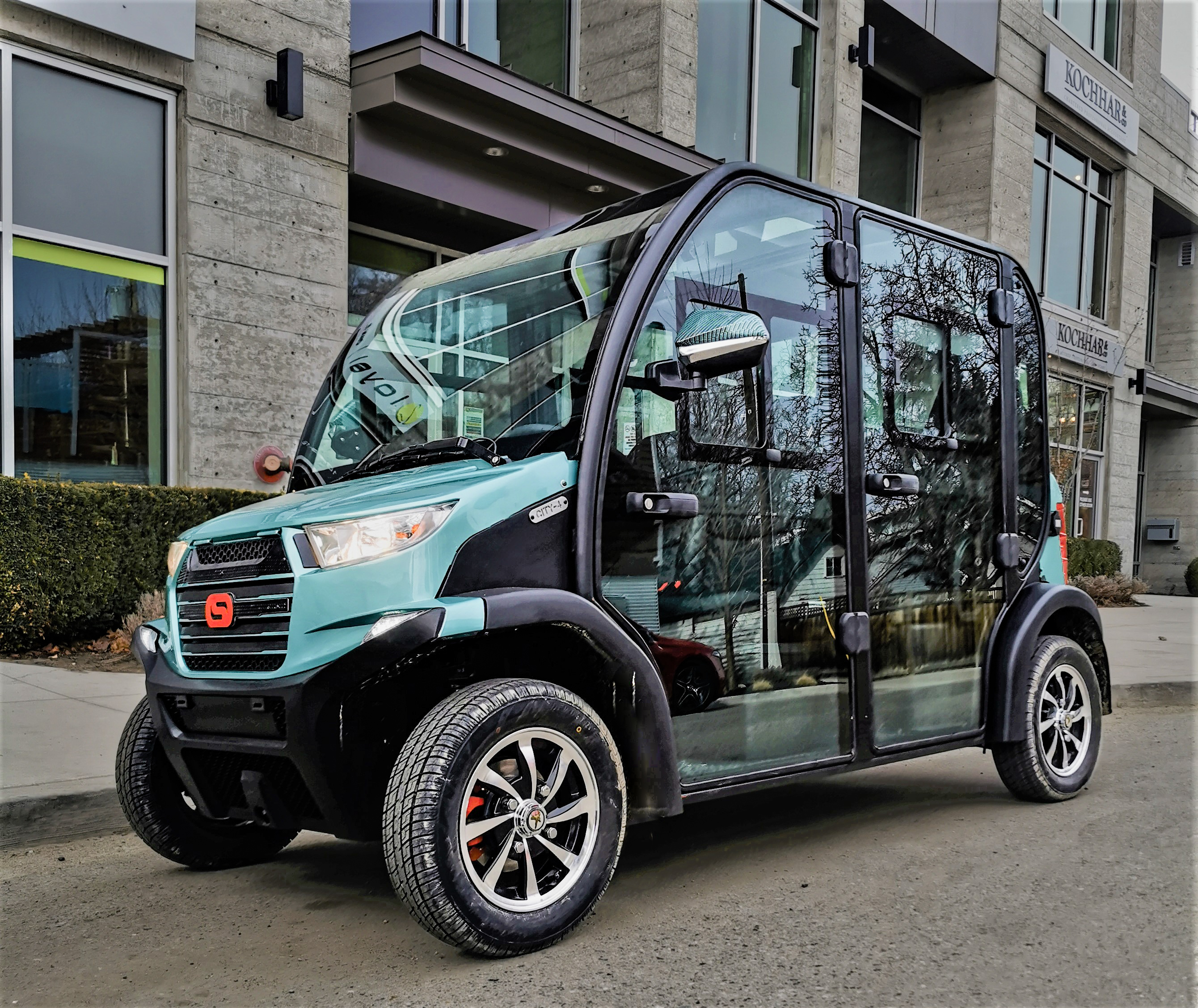
CITY4 from SC Carts

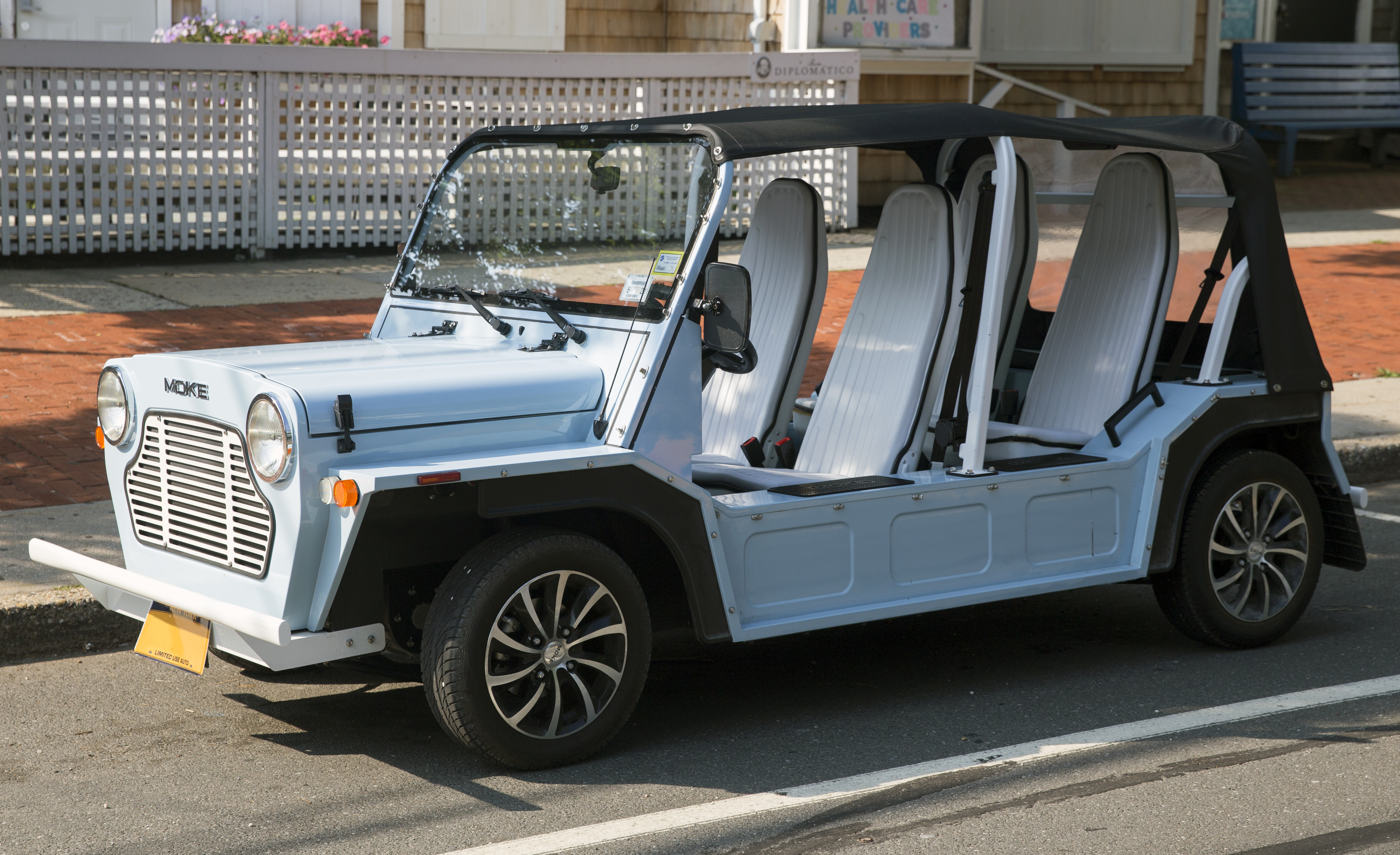
2019 Moke America eMoke, front left (Amagansett)

== See also ==
- City car
- Government incentives for plug-in electric vehicles
- Medium-speed vehicle
- Microvan and Kei car
- Quadricycle (EU vehicle classification) – EU vehicle category for four-wheeled microcars
- Solar golf cart
- Electric Commercial Vehicles
  - Electric platform truck
  - Milk float
- Electric rickshaw
