= Dynasty IT =

Canadian electric car

Overview
- Manufacturer: Dynasty Electric Vehicles Ltd.
- Production: 2001 - present

Body and chassis
- Class: Battery Electric microcar
- Body style: 5 door multi-purpose

Powertrain
- Engine: Battery
- Transmission: Front wheel drive

Dimensions
- Length: 140 in (3566mm)
- Width: 60 in (1524mm)
- Height: 63 in (1600mm)
- Curb weight: 1450 lbs (653kg)

The Dynasty IT was a Canadian electric car produced by Dynasty Electric Car Corporation, designed to qualify as a neighbourhood electric vehicle, primarily made for urban, recreational and light commercial markets. It was available in five variants including a sedan, mini pick-up, van and two open air versions. The North American version has a range of up to 50 kilometres (30 miles) and does not exceed 40 kilometres/hour (25 mph). Most models have a curb weight of 653 kilograms (1450 lb).

Dynasty was bought by Karakoram Motors of Pakistan, who in 2018 said they planned to produce it in Pakistan.

Use of the vehicle was legal as a low-speed vehicle (LSV) in British Columbia and 47 US states. A version of the car appeared on the American Sci-Fi Channel TV series Eureka. For the show's purposes, it is covered with photovoltaic cells to appear to be a solar-powered car.

== Gallery ==
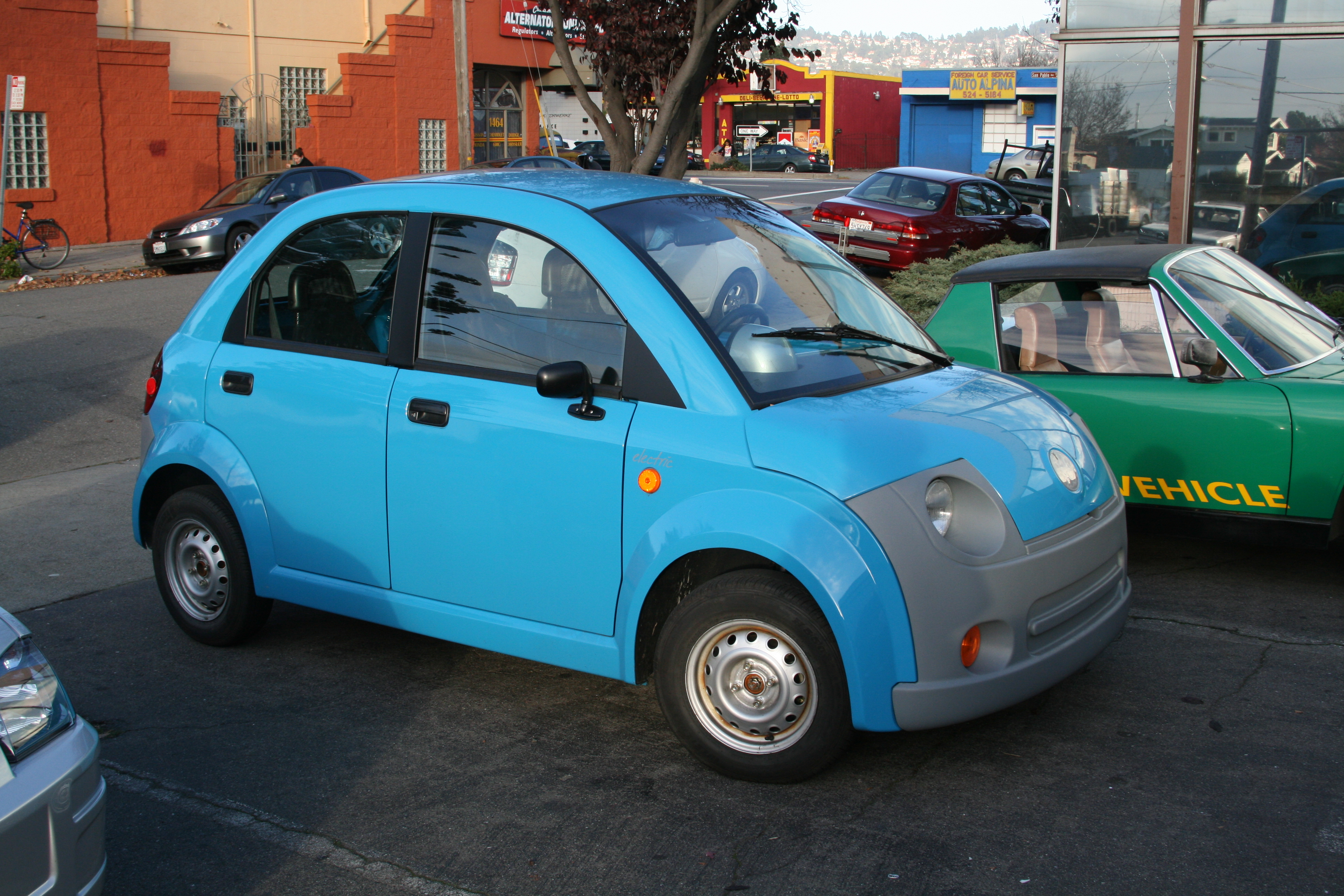
Four passenger sedan

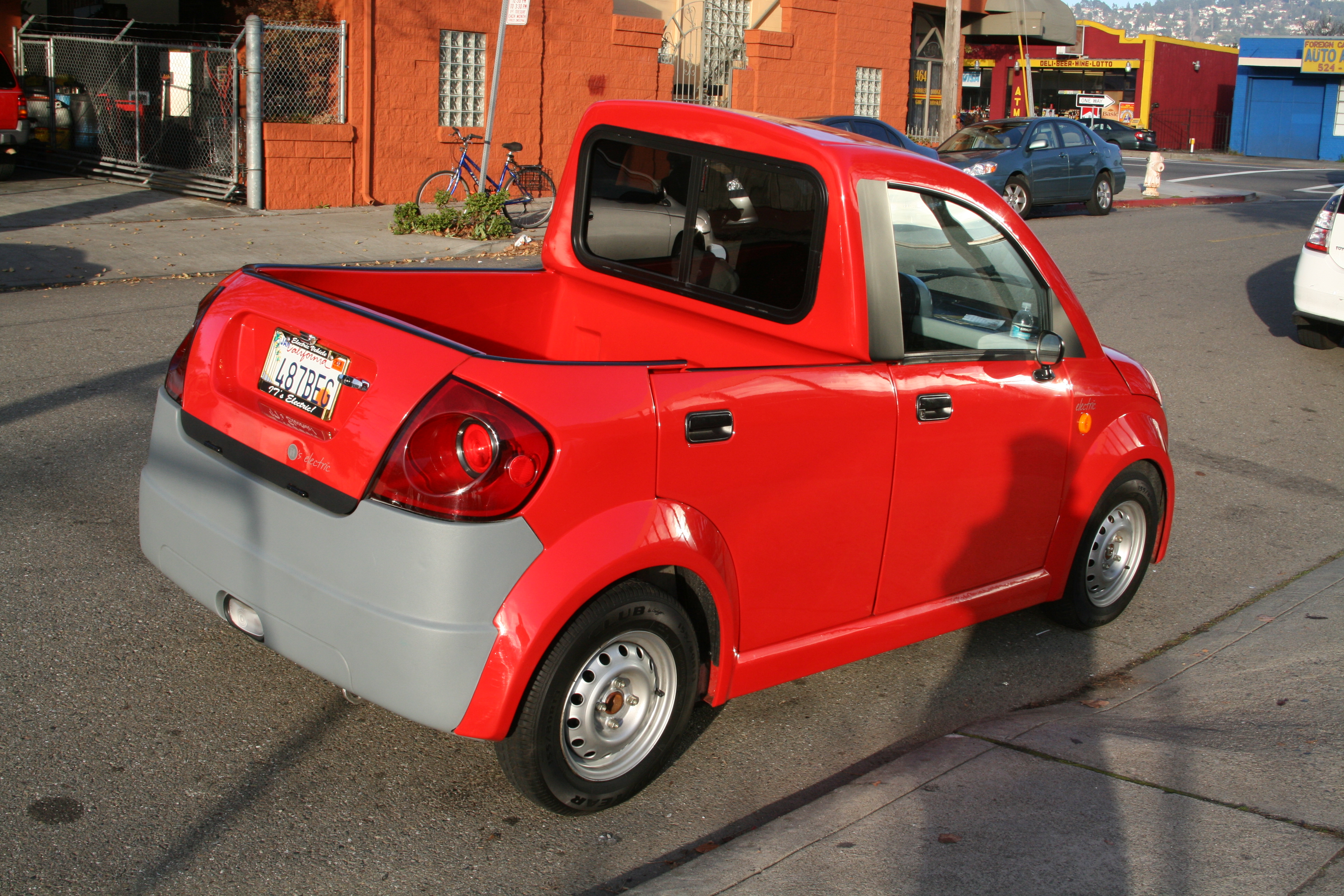
Two passenger utility

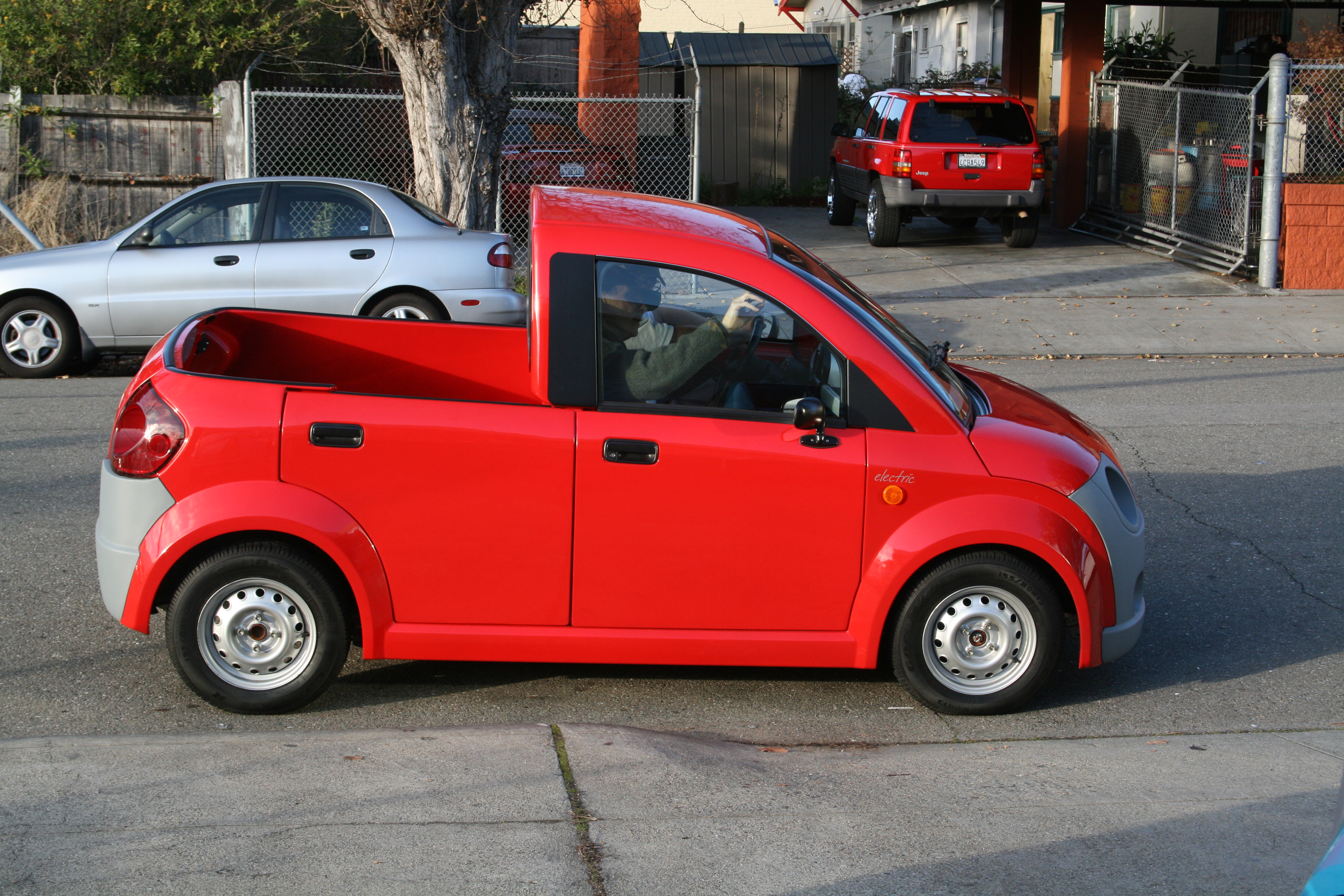
Load area has rear and right side doors

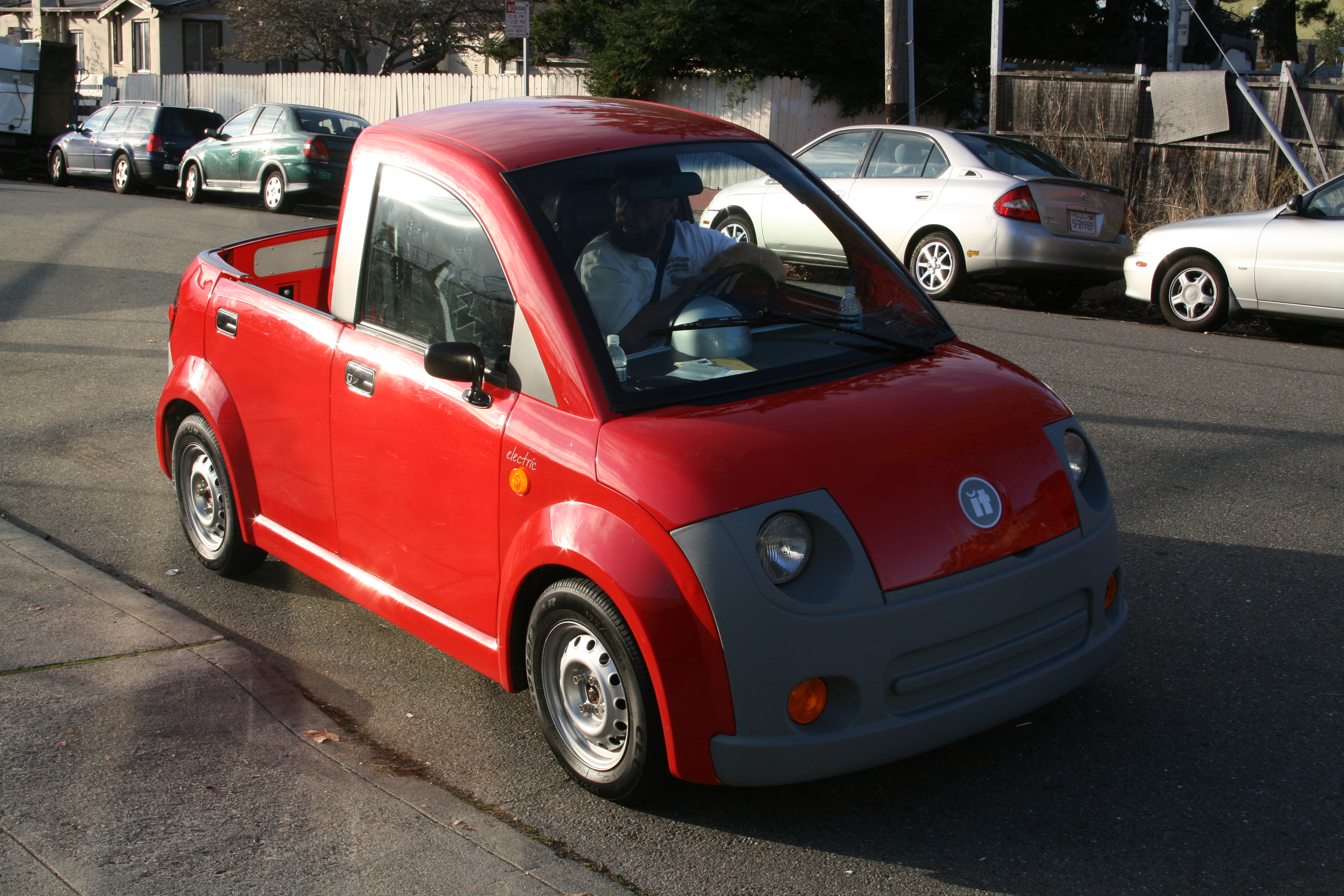
