= Italcar =

Italian car manufacturer

Italcar is an Italian company, located in Turin, which produces and distributes electric vehicles.

== Description ==
The vehicles carried by Italcar range from golf carts to utility to neighborhood electric vehicles. The vehicles can be used for luggage, as a shuttle, maintenance, or for recreational activities like golf.

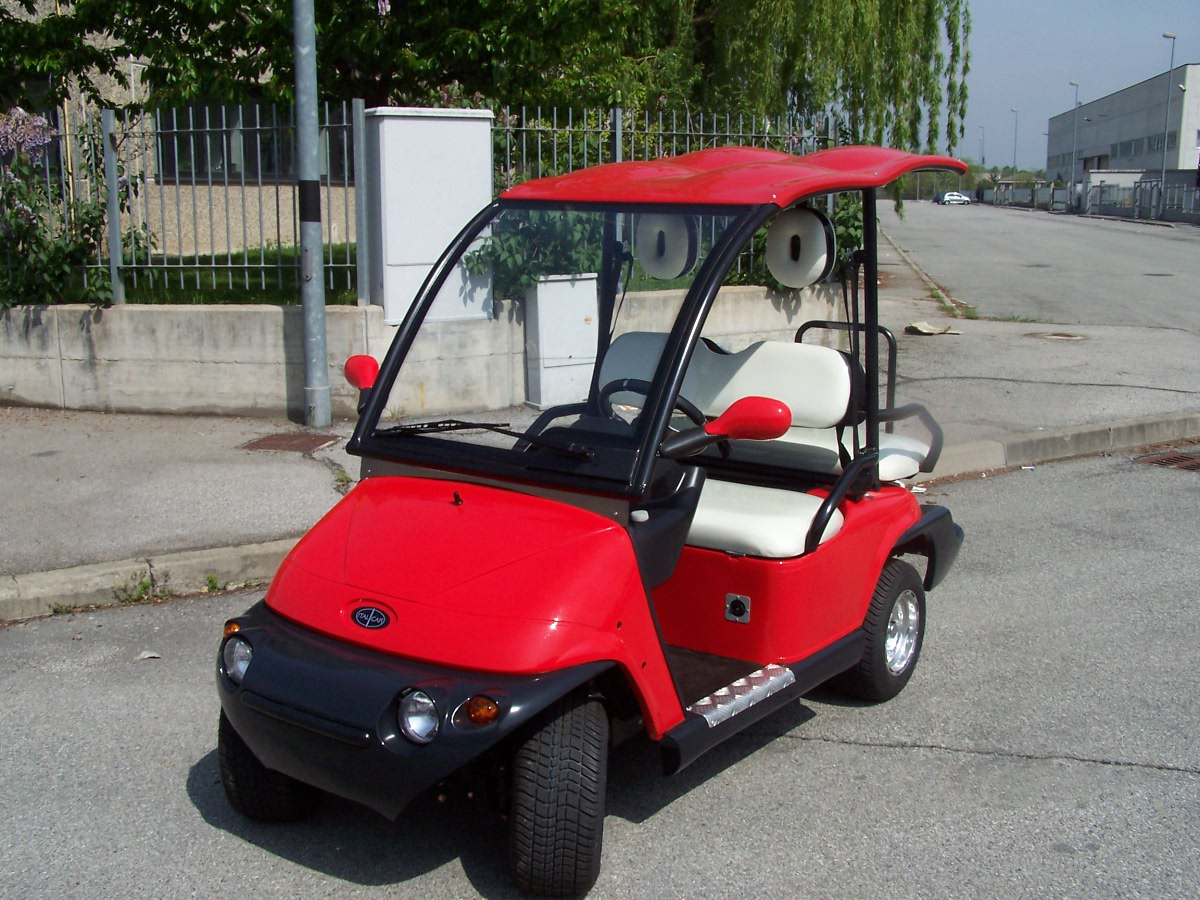
Italcar Neighborhood Electric Vehicle (NEV)

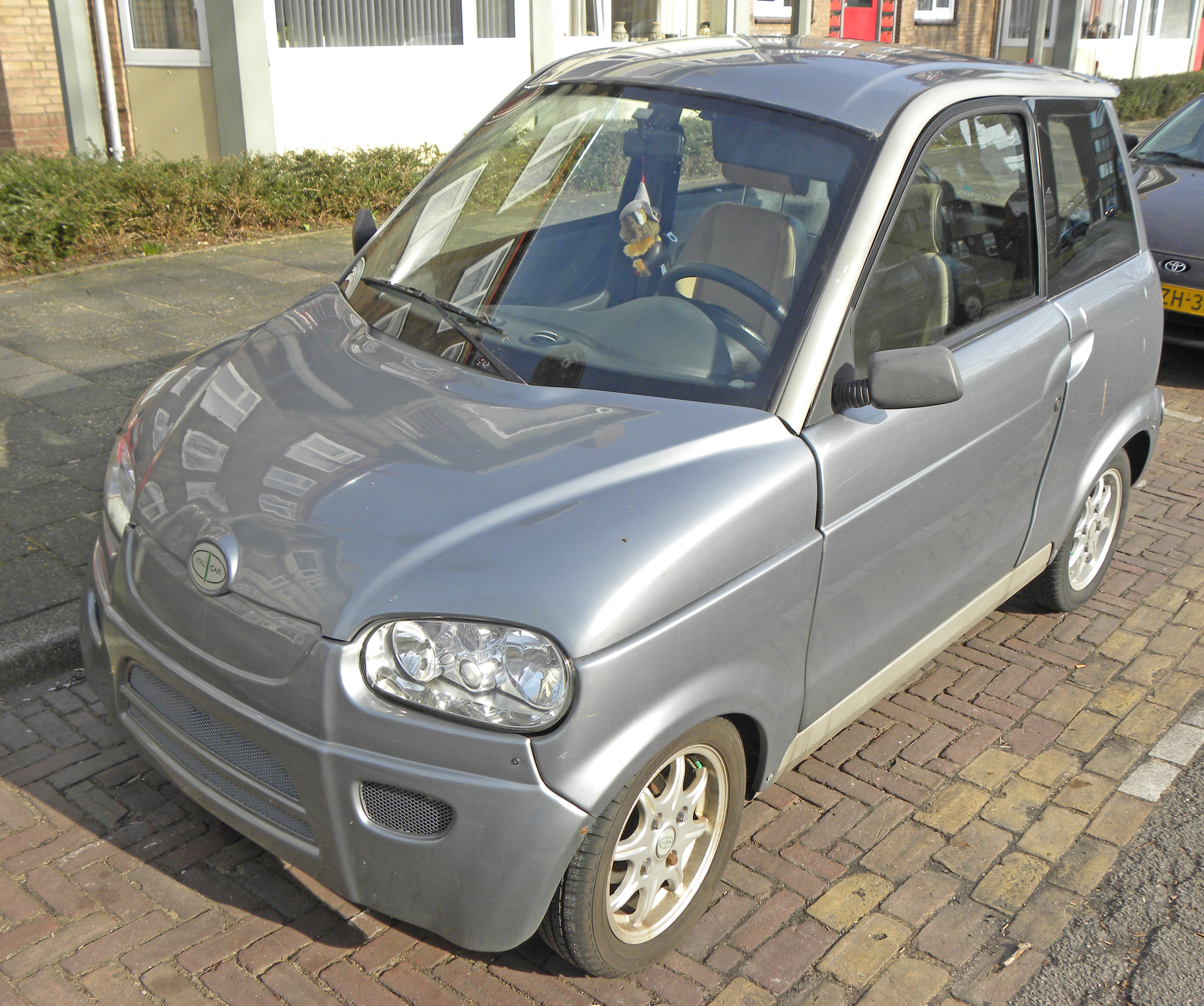
Italcar T2 Elegant

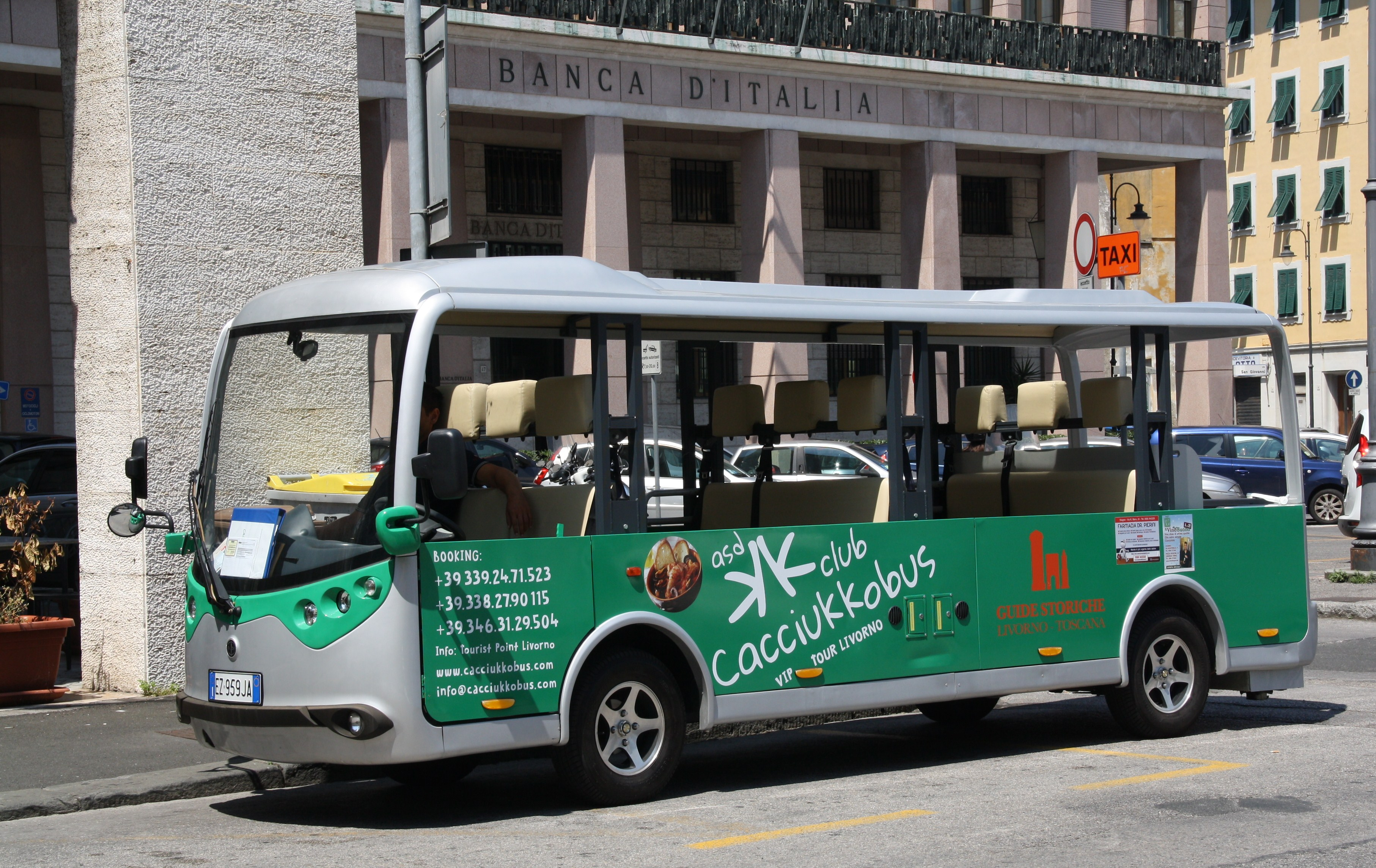
Italcar M2 electric bus in Livorno
