= Tiger Truck =

Chinese light utility truck

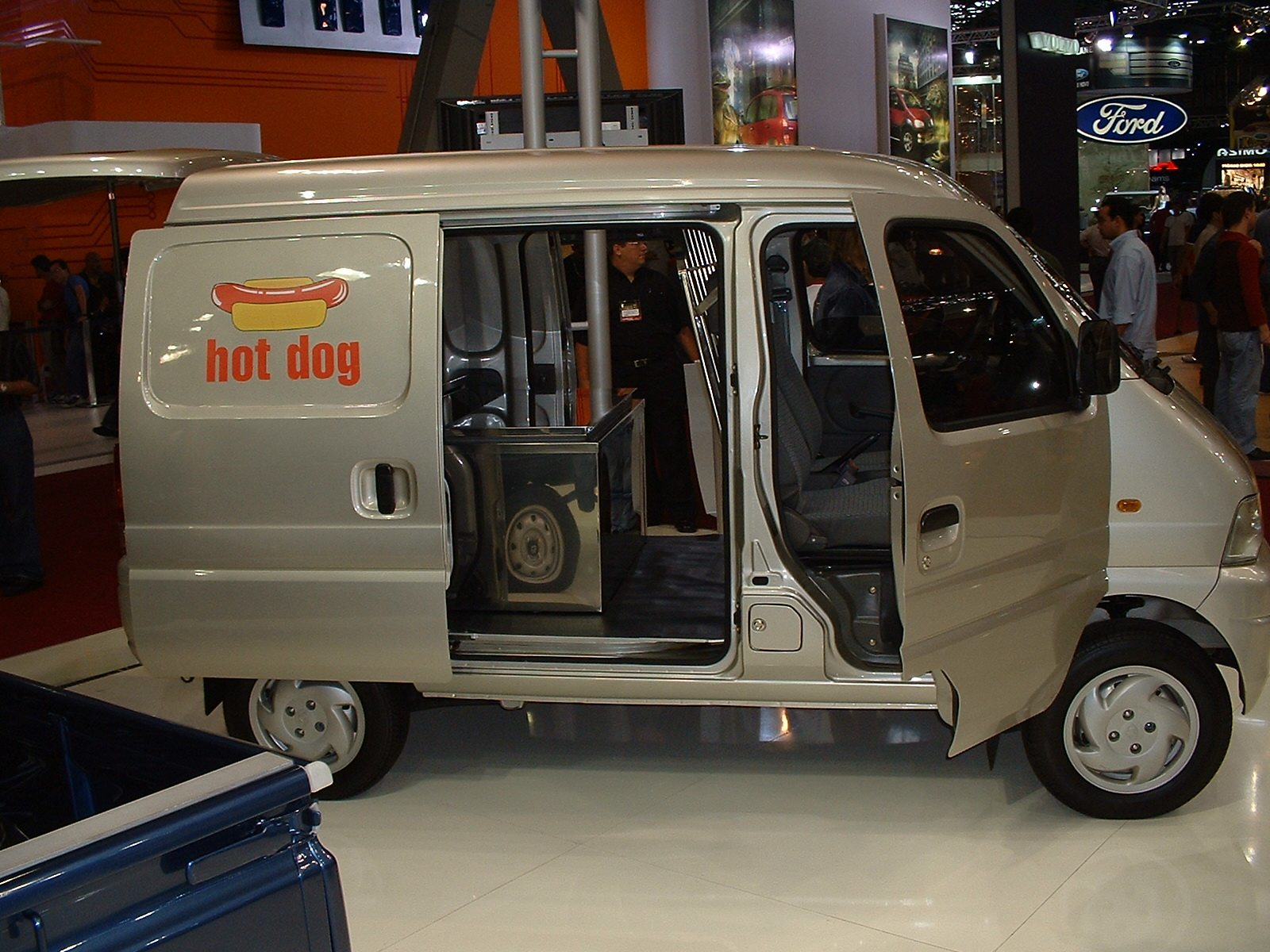
Tiger Star van in hotdog delivery setup.

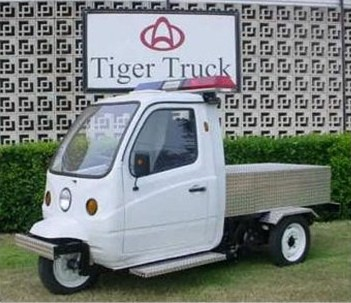
Three wheel electric Tiger Truck with logo.

The Tiger Truck is a light utility truck sub-brand from Chinese manufacturer Chang'an. It belongs to a class of vehicles known as “mini-trucks,” “micro trucks,” “K trucks,” and "kei trucks”. The K is short for kei jidosha, Japanese for “light vehicle” and the name of a special class of vehicles subject to reduced taxation in Japan. In the United States, this class of vehicle is classified as a low speed vehicle as defined under CFR 49-571.500 and is limited to a top speed of 25 MPH. As such, it is only legal for off highway use and/or local road use.

The Tiger Truck is known for its diminutive size, but good reliability under harsh conditions and its refined ride quality. The Tiger Truck logo is an homage to the Star Trek logo, meant to highlight the futuristic design and features of the truck. The Tiger Truck offers gasoline, E85 and electric models. A wide range of models from trucks and crew cabs to vans are available. The Tiger Truck is known for its rigorous quality control standards, including their patented tiger-proof test. Also offered are a suite of accessories such as a snowplow, pintle hitch, front brush guard, security light, hot dog cooker and others.

The Tiger Star model is an upgraded and more robust off-road utility truck than most off-road vehicles in its class. The advanced Star class trucks feature robust electric drive, with a 48 volt, 5 kW motor mated with a five-speed transmission. All Tiger Trucks are California Air Resources Board certified. Original design was based on the Suzuki Every/ Suzuki Carry based Changan Star kei vans and kei trucks due to the licensed production by the Changan Suzuki joint venture in China.

Tiger has the largest available array of truck body options for niche applications. Primary distribution in the U.S. is through a select dealership network. Tiger Trucks are being assembled in Poteau, Oklahoma, under the "Tiger Truck" brand to better supply the North American demand for these trucks.

== Models ==
=== Gas models ===
- Tiger Star
- Crew cab and X-cab
- Tiger Star van
- Tiger Star cargo van
- Tiger Star volume van
- Tiger Champ 4500 std
- Tiger Champ 4500 crew

=== Flex-Fuel (E85) models ===
- Tiger Star
- Crew cab and X-cb
- Tiger Star van
- Tiger Star cargo van
- Tiger Star volume van
- Tiger Champ 4500 std
- Tiger Champ 4500 crew

=== Electric models ===
- Electric Tiger Star
- Electric Tiger Star van
- Electric Tiger E-bus

=== Electric car ===
- Tiger Cub - a two-seat electric car
