= BugE =

The BugE is a one-passenger, three-wheeled battery electric vehicle designed by Mark Murphy of Blue Sky Design in 2007. It can reach up to 40 mph in standard form, and can run for 30 miles on a full charge. The BugE is licensed as a motorcycle and can run on all major streets in the United States of America. A fully completed BugE vehicle is as of May 2015 is listed at US$5,732.30.

== Origin ==
Prior to the BugE, its designer, Blue Sky had created and sold a vehicle called the Gizmo. The Gizmo was a more costly vehicle, with over 17 major components. The 2005 models of the Gizmo were priced at $12,000.

Through a series of collaborations of many small business mainly based in the Pacific Northwest, the idea for a smaller and more cost effective vehicle was designed. The man credited with the main concept design of an “almost-fully-faired three-wheeler” is named Mark Murphy, of Creswell, Oregon, who is also the owner of Blue Sky Design LLC. Murphy is known for being a “designer on concept projects for companies such as GM, Chrysler and BMW.” “His design criteria [for the BugE] was for ‘a simple, low cost personal mobility vehicle." On February 5, 2007, the BugE had its first run. It drove out of a garage and down a flat suburb street. The run was captured and put on YouTube by one of the creators. Not even a month later the BugE was certified as a street legal motorcycle.

== Design ==
The BugE has handlebar steering, a bucket seat, uni-shock suspension, a parking brake, low-drag tires, drum brakes and three mag wheels. A rounded fairing reaches up and over the driver for the full length of the vehicle and reduces the vehicles aerodynamic drag. The fairing can pushed up and tilted forward to allow a driver to enter the vehicle. Attached to the fairing and acting as a sort of windshield is a clear canopy made of optically blown acrylic. Behind the fairing and canopy is an optional removable rear canopy. All vehicle controls are operated by the handlebars, including the throttle and brakes.

The battery compartment holds a 48 volt battery and is located underneath the vehicle. The BugE has one cargo compartment located in the front of the vehicle between the two front tires. The cargo compartment is designed to hold two large or four small bags of groceries and can carry up to 25 pounds of cargo. In addition to the single compartment, the driver's seat is designed to withstand up to an extra 10 pounds of cargo via a small backpack that can be hung from the seat back. In the base model, the seat is bolted into place. This can be made to be adjustable with additional modifications.

The BugE base vehicle kit is made of 17 major components and 75 total parts and weighs 350 pounds fully assembled. The simple electrical system has only five major parts. Of the five major electrical parts, only two of them move: the potentiometer and the motor. The three non-moving parts include the batteries, of which there are four, all connected in the battery compartment, the controller, and the battery charger. All of the pre-assembled kits are provided by vendors in the United States and 70% of their materials are made in the Pacific Northwest.

=== Function ===
Like most electric motors, the BugE motor produces torque and low-end power suitable for efficient stop-and-go driving. The engine does not idle and instead turns off during traffic stops. A BugE can be charged by plugging it into any 120 volt wall outlet. The BugE website claims “Energy efficiency is 1 cent per mile” and estimates the cost of a full battery charge at around 40 cents.

The slim design of the vehicle allows it to be parked in spaces up to four times smaller than the average parking space. The height of the BugE brings the driver to a height level similar to other automotive drivers, and the scope of the fairing help to make the smaller vehicle visible in traffic. The one piece fairing deflects rain and wind from hitting the driver directly, but its lack of windshield wipers causes water to bead up on the fairing during wet-weather driving.

Because the fairing is attached to the vehicle via the front axle, it is prone to clunky vibrations at low speeds and on turbulent surfaces. The nature and position of the motor produce a constant, loud mechanical sound much like a motorcycle. The weight limit for the vehicle, including the driver and all carried cargo, is 200 pounds.

=== Kits ===
The BugE kits are a series of parts and components, provided by Blue Sky Design LLC, to build a fully functioning vehicle. There are three main kits sold. The main one being the basic BugE kit.In the basic kit, most of the parts that are needed to build a fully functioning BugE are available. The other two kits provide additional parts and are available from Blue Sky to make the BugE fully functioning. The remaining parts can also be found at hardware stores. The kits come at additional costs. All the parts in the lighting & control kit and the power kit are required to make the BugE fully functioning. The kits are designed so that no special tools or knowledge is needed to build the BugE.

| Basic BugE Kit- $4000 | Lighting & Control Kit- $325 | Power Kit from EV Parts- $1412.30 |
|---|---|---|
| Fully welded steel Chassis with front and rear mono shock suspension system; Includes Shock Absorbers, Steering Spindles and Tie rods; White gel-coated fiberglass Fairing with molded fenders and storage compartment; Fiberglass Seat Pan with rear fender; Fiberglass Battery compartment; Bucket Seat; Optically blown clear acrylic Canopy; Seat cover; Custom wheel Sprocket and motor Sprocket; Specialty fasteners, latches, switches; Parking brake Lever; Powder coated mag type cast aluminum Wheels with Brakes and Tires; 84 page illustrated Assembly Manual; Complete part and tool list; Owner's Manual; Decal set; Certificate Of Origin | 12 volt wiring harness; Control switches; Brake light and turn signals; Chain, horn, relay; Brake levers and cables | 48 volt Advanced DC drive motor; Power Controller; Charging System; Throttle pot; Power meter; DC/DC converter; Contactor |

=== Modifications ===
==== Motors ====
The Advanced DC drive motor that comes with the Power Kit offered through EV parts on the BugE website is a series-wound DC motor This is one of the three most popular motors used for electric vehicles. The DC motor is known for its torque but falls short in those areas where hills are abundant.

There are two main types of DC motors, brushed and brushless.

Brushed DC motors are the oldest type of DC motor and have been in use commercially since the 1800s. There are different variations of brushed DC motors but the basic setup contains a wound rotor with either a wound or permanent magnet stator. These motors require more maintenance than the brushless version because the brushes become worn and eventually require replacement. The brushless DC motors weren't commercially available until 1962 and they offer some significant advantages over their predecessor. The brushless DC motor offers higher torque to weight ratio, more efficiency, reduced noise and longer lifetime than the brushed motors, due to the lack of possible brush and commutator erosion.

The DC motor is able to run directly on the power supplied through rechargeable batteries and when external power is applied to the DC motor, it acts as a generator called a dynamo. This feature is used in electric vehicles to recharge the batteries and slow down the vehicle in a process known as regenerative braking.

The other popular motor to consider when building a BugE is an AC motor. There are two main classifications for AC motors: induction and synchronous. The most popular AC motor for electric vehicles is the 3-phase induction motor. The AC motor still uses a DC power source so, instead of the controller that would be used with a DC drive system, an inverter is needed. This can increase the overall price in comparison with the DC motor system.

A BugE builder from Canada modified his vehicle with an AC motor that was originally designed to be used in a Golf Cart and he states that “at 48 volts, the motor operates at about 90% efficiency, puts out up to 18hp and exhibits a torque of 86 ft-lbs.”

==== Batteries ====
Batteries are not included in any of the kits offered through the manufacturer of BugE, although the basic kit does include a 20" long x 14" wide x 9" tall fiberglass battery compartment. The suggested batteries to use are Four M34 AGM Blue Top lead acid batteries. Lead acid batteries have a low energy to weight ratio but can supply a high surge current, which increases their power to weight ratio and allows them to supply the high current required by the electric motors used in the BugE. Only the Optima Blue Top batteries will fit within the fiberglass battery compartment offered with the basic kit.

There are other types of electric vehicle batteries to consider but the most widely utilized is the lithium-ion battery. There are several types of lithium-ion batteries, including lithium cobalt oxide and lithium iron phosphate.

Lithium cobalt batteries offer a higher energy density but also provide a greater risk for damage and potential safety hazard, especially when overcharged or used in higher temperatures. Because of the improvement in thermal properties, the lithium iron phosphate batteries have a simpler charging process, reduced risk of damage during charging and an overall reduced health risk in comparison with the lithium cobalt battery. The lithium iron phosphates are also rated for 2000 to 3000 cycles of full charge and discharge versus lithium cobalt's typical range of 200 cycles.

For different types of batteries, a new battery compartment would need to be made.
