= The Kurrent =

Overview
- Manufacturer: The American Electric Vehicle Company (AEVCO)
- Production: 2006-2007
- Designer: Maurizio Tomaselli

Body and chassis
- Class: neighborhood electric vehicle
- Body style: 2 seat
- Platform: Unique;

Powertrain
- Engine: 4.1 kW electric motor plus 4 lead Deepcycle batteries

Dimensions
- Length: 92 inches
- Width: 50 inches
- Curb weight: ~1080 lbs

The Kurrent is a neighborhood electric vehicle that was built between 2006 and 2007 by the now defunct American Electric Motor Vehicle Company.

== Features ==
The Kurrent has a 4.1 kW electrical motor powered by four 12 volt lead–gel sealed batteries (total 48 volts). It can travel up to 35–40 miles (56–64 km) on a charge. Charge time from a 120 V outlet is approximately 8 hours. It featured regenerative brakes, a lockable 7.5 cubic foot trunk and a separate 12 volt battery to power optional equipment.

== Concept ==
The Kurrent's design was based on the European line of microcars (which were inspired by motorcycles). They were built in Wixom, Michigan.

Production of the Kurrent stopped in 2007, and the American Electric Motor Vehicle Company ceased operations in 2008.
