= Low-speed vehicle =

Vehicle with low maximum capable speed

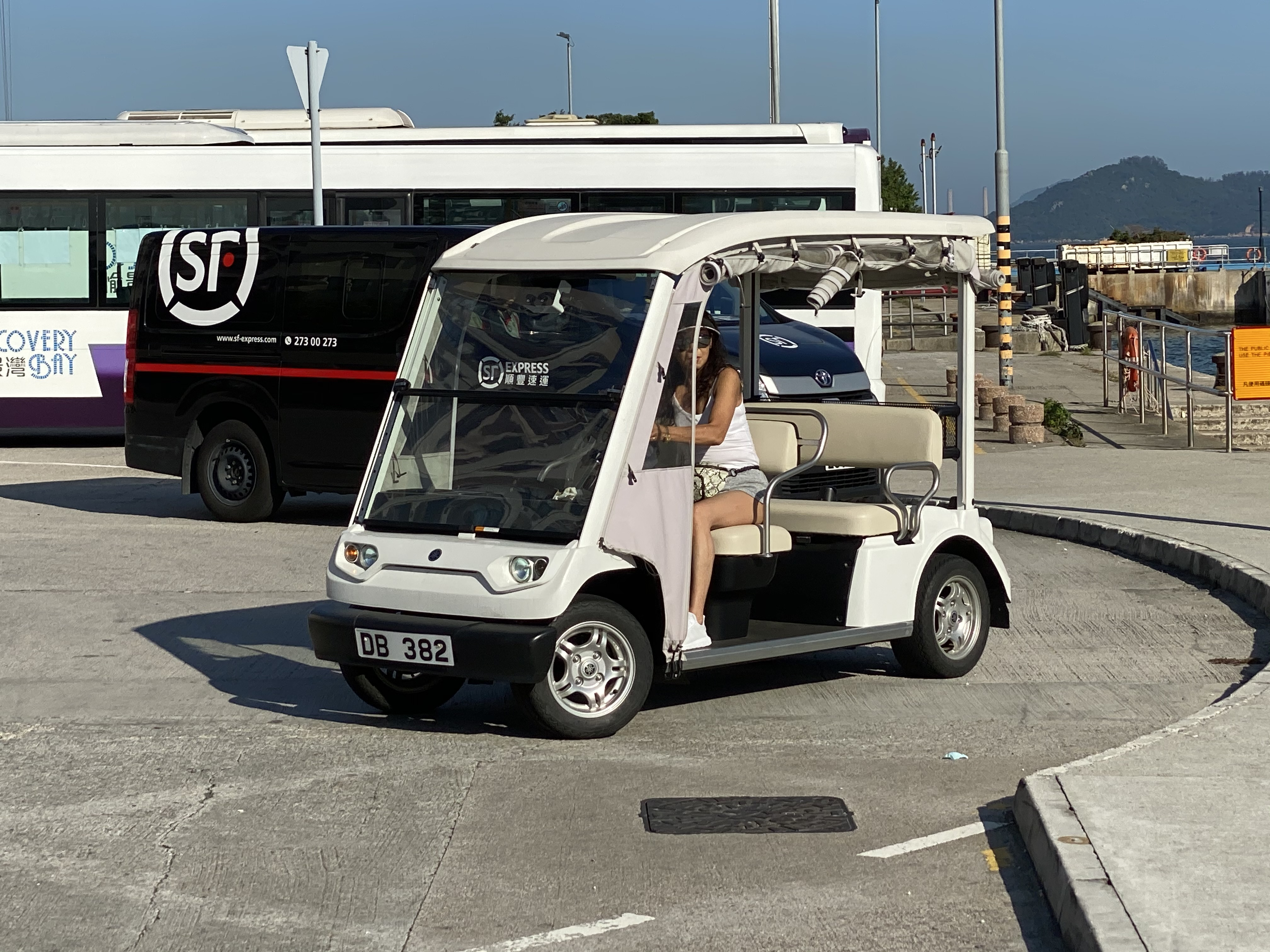
Yamaha's low-speed vehicle (LSV) in Discovery Bay.

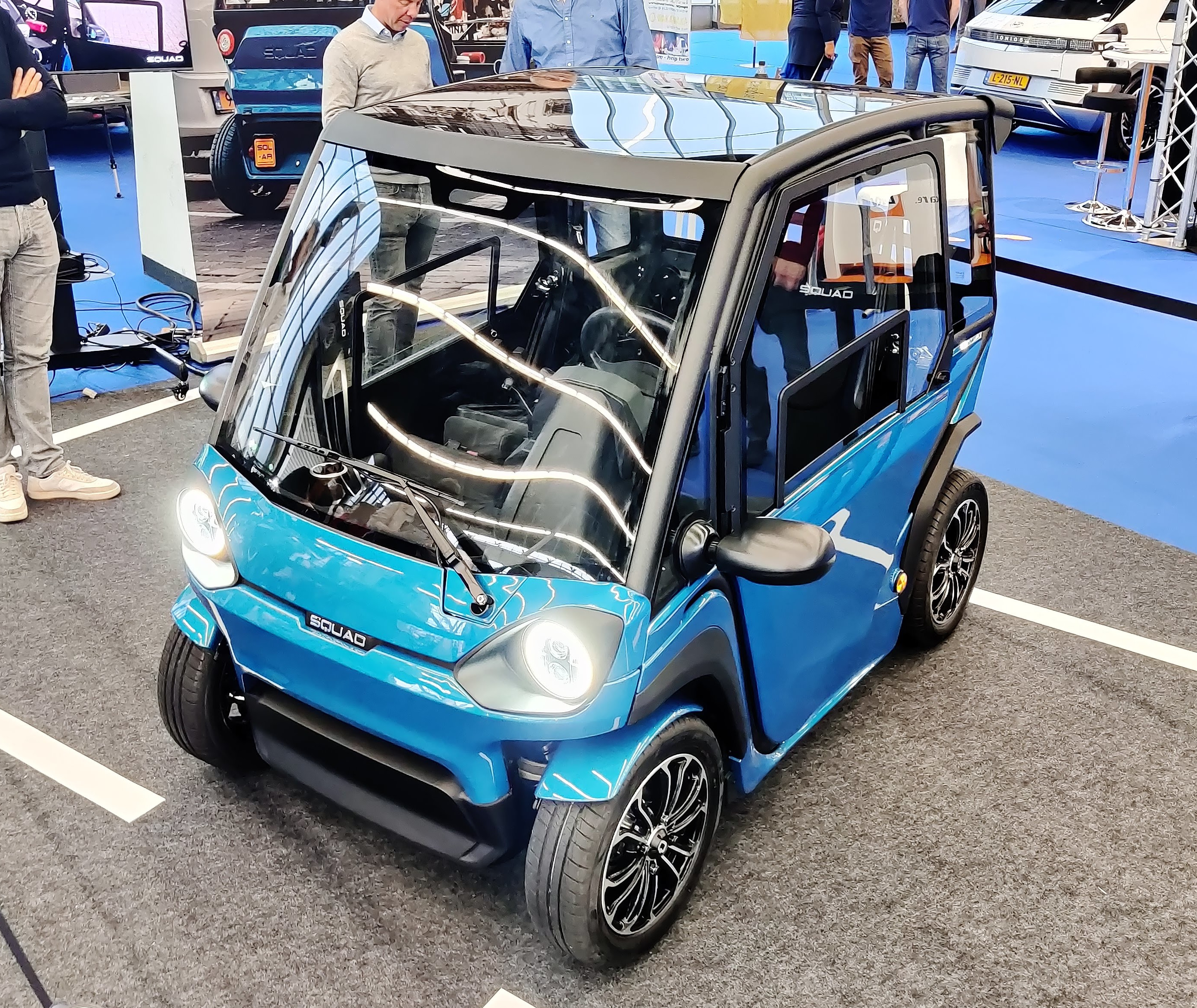
Squad Solar Neighborhood Electric Vehicle

An orange triangle required on the rear of low-speed vehicles in several countries

In the United States and Canada, low-speed vehicle (LSV) regulations allow relaxed design and registration laws for four-wheel vehicles that have a maximum capable speed of about 25 mph (40 km/h). Several other countries have similar regulations.

== Canada ==
Under Motor Vehicle Safety Regulations, a low-speed vehicle is defined as a vehicle, other than an all-terrain vehicle, a truck or a vehicle imported temporarily for special purposes, that is powered by an electric motor, produces no emissions, is designed to travel on 4 wheels and has an attainable speed in 1.6 km of more than 32 km/h (20 mph) but not more than 40 km/h (25 mph) on a paved level surface.

Low-speed vehicles are currently street legal in British Columbia, Quebec, and Ontario.

SC Carts was the first Canadian manufacturer to begin producing street legal low-speed vehicles.

== France ==
Quadricycles (the EU vehicle classification covering this type of vehicle) can be driven without a car licence, and are known as voitures sans permis (VSP), literally “cars without licence”. Despite this name, drivers must first sit a written road-safety exam, and be at least 14 years old before legally being allowed to drive this type of vehicle.

== Philippines ==
The Philippines Land Transportation Franchising and Regulatory Board has created a Low-Speed Vehicle category for four--wheeled motor vehicles that use alternative fuel (such as electricity) and have a maximum speed of 40 km/h (25 mph).

This regulation was created for the E-jeepney electric-powered minibuses, which were introduced in 2007. The E-jeepney carries 17 passengers and can run 120 km on an 8-hour charge from an electric outlet.

== United States ==
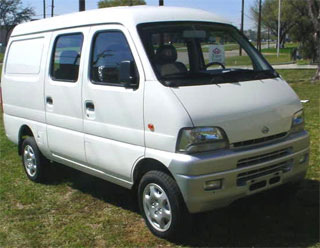
A Tiger Star LSV van with a maximum speed of 30 mph (48 km/h)

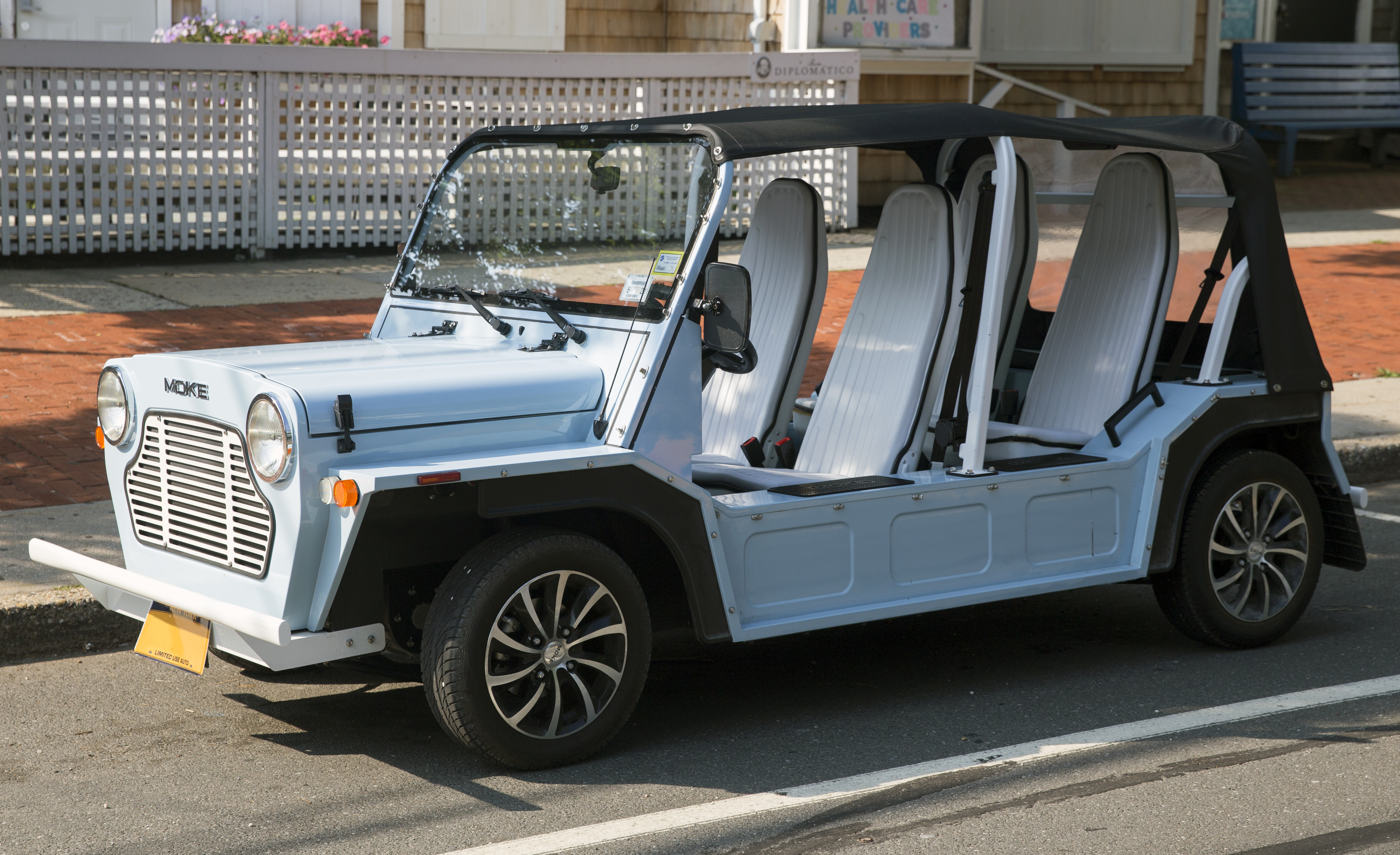
The Moke America eMoke by Chery/MOKE International/Cruise Car

The National Highway Traffic Safety Administration has published safety guidelines in the United States which apply to vehicles operating in the 20–25 mile-per-hour speed range. Low-speed vehicles are defined as a four-wheeled motor vehicle that has a gross vehicle weight rating of less than 3,000 pounds (1,400 kg) and a top speed of between 20 and 25 mph (32 and 40 km/h).

States which have specific regulations for LSVs include Alaska, California, Indiana, Iowa, Kansas, Louisiana, Maine Maryland, Missouri, New York, Oregon, Rhode Island, South Carolina, Tennessee, Utah and Washington, DC.

Nearly all 50 states allow LSVs, also called Neighborhood Electric Vehicles (NEVs), to drive on their roads where the speed limit is 35 mph or less. Either they follow FMVSS500 (25 mph top speed on 35 mph limit roads), or make their own more aggressive law. Because of federal law, car dealers cannot legally sell the vehicles to go faster than 25 mph (40 km/h), but the buyer can easily modify the car to go 35 mph (56 km/h). However, if modified to exceed 25 mph (40 km/h), the vehicle then becomes subject to additional safety requirements.

These speed restrictions, combined with a typical driving range of 30 miles (48 km) per charge and a typical three-year battery durability, are required because of a lack of federally mandated safety equipment and features which NEVs cannot accommodate because of their design. To satisfy federal safety requirements for manufacturers, NEVs must be equipped with three-point seat belts or a lap belt, running lights, headlights, brake lights, reflectors, rear view mirrors, and turn signals; windshield wipers are not required. In many cases, doors may be optional, crash protection from other vehicles is partially met compared to other non-motorized transport such as bicycles because of the use of seat belts. In 2011, a Time magazine article concluded that the lack of passenger safety protection made most LSVs unfit for city driving, despite their excellent maneuverability.

=== Short commute vehicles ===
Short commute vehicle (SCV) is a term sometimes used for vehicles that are used for regular trips of 10 mi (16 km) or less. The term "ultra small vehicle" is also used for similar styles of vehicle.

SCVs are faster than 3 mph (5 km/h)—walking pace—and not regulated by other Motor Vehicle Legislation. It would include vehicles regulated under FMVSS500 (USA Low Speed Vehicle Regulation), CMVSS500 (Canadian Low Speed Vehicle Regulation) and certain L-category vehicles (Quadricycle L6 and L7) in the EU. Battery electric vehicles (BEV) are highly suited as Short Commute Vehicles due to their inherent short operating range; however, SCVs do not have to be BEVs.

Since 2010, the American Association of Retired Persons and Insurance Institute for Highway Safety have expressed concerns about mixed traffic flows including this class of vehicle.

== See also ==
- Battery electric vehicle
- Golf cart
- Medium-speed vehicle
- Neighborhood electric vehicle
- Quadricycles
