= China concepts stock =

China Concepts Stock is a set of stock of companies whose assets or earnings have significant activities in mainland China. The People's Republic of China is undergoing major financial transformation, and many leading mainland-based companies have chosen to list themselves overseas to gain access to foreign investor capital. Currently, there are China Concepts Stocks listed on several major stock exchanges around the globe, including the Hong Kong Stock Exchange (HKEx), Singapore Exchange (SGX), New York Stock Exchange (NYSE), NASDAQ, NYSE MKT (formerly known as the American Stock Exchange), London Stock Exchange (LSE), Euronext, and the Tokyo Stock Exchange (TSE).

== United States ==
Some China Concepts Stocks listed on the NYSE, NASDAQ, and NYSE MKT take the form of American Depositary Receipts (ADR) instead of common stock.

=== New York Stock Exchange (NYSE) ===
Company Name	Ticker
PetroChina	PTR
Sinopec	SNP
Huaneng Power International	HNP
CNOOC	CEO
China Telecom	CHA
China Mobile	CHL
China Life Insurance Company	LFC
China Unicom	CHU
China Netcom	CN
China New Borun	BORN
ATRenew	RERE
Aluminum Corporation of China Limited	ACH
Semiconductor Manufacturing International Corporation	SMI
China Eastern Airlines	CEA
Yanzhou Coal Mining Company	YZC
China Southern Airlines	ZNH
Guangshen Railway Co., Ltd.	GSH
Suntech Power	STP
New Oriental	EDU
China Yuchi International Limited	CYD
E-House (China) Holdings Limited	EJ
Mindray	MR
Yingli Green Energy Holding Company Limited	YGE
Giant Interactive Group	GA
Longtop Financial Technologies Limited	LFT
China Digital TV Holding Co., LTD.	STV
Noah Education Holdings Ltd.	NED
China Nepstar	NPD
Agria Corporation	GRO
American Dairy, Inc.	ADY
Acorn International, Inc.	ATV
LDK Solar Co	LDK
China Security & Surveillance Technology, Inc.	CSR
Trina Solar	TSL
Tongjitang Chinese Medicines Company	TCM
Wuxi Pharmatech	WX
ZTO Express	ZTO

=== NASDAQ ===
Company Name	Ticker
CDC Corporation/Chinadotcom	CHINA
AsiaInfo	ASIA
UTStarcom	UTSI
SINA Corporation	SINA
NetEase	NTES
Sohu	SOHU
Ctrip.com International, Ltd.	CTRP
Linktone, Ltd.	LTON
Qiao Xing	XING
Shanda	SNDA
Xiao-I Corporation	AIXI
The9	NCTY
Ninetowns Internet Technology Group Company Limited	NINE
MAAS Inc	MAAS
TomoTherapy	TOMO
KongZhong Corporation	KONG
51job, Inc.	JOBS
China Finance Online Co. Limited	JRJC
eLong, Inc.	LONG
China Automotive Systems, Inc.	CAAS
Hurray! Holding Co., Ltd.	HRAY
Baidu	BIDU
Cogo Group, Inc.	COGO
Focus Media Holding	FMCN
Actions Semiconductor	ACTS
Vimicro International Corporation	VIMC
Home Inns & Hotels Management Inc.	HMIN
TechFaith	CNTF
China BAK Battery, Inc.	CBAK
Origin Agritech Limited	SEED
PacificNet	PACT
China Medical Technologies	CMED
China Technology Development Group Corporation	CTDC
SORL Auto Parts, Inc.	SORL
China Grentech Corporation Limited	GRRF
e-Future Information Technology Inc.	EFUT
Canadian Solar Inc.	CSIQ
Harbin Electric, Inc.	HRBN
China Natural Resources, Inc.	CHNR
Telestone Technologies Corp.	TSTC
AirMedia Group Inc	AMCN
Yucheng Technologies Limited	YTEC
ChinaEdu Corporation	CEDU
Zhongpin Inc.	HOGS
Synutra International, Inc.	SYUT
Fushi Copperweld	FSIN
Wonder Auto Technology, Inc.	WATG
Solarfun Power Holdings Co., Ltd.	SOLF
Fuwei Films (Holdings) Co., Ltd.	FFHL
JA Solar Holdings	JASO
3SBio Inc.	SSRX
Spreadtrum Communications, Inc.	SPRD
China Sunergy	CSUN
China Precision Steel, Inc.	CPSL

=== NYSE MKT (formerly known as AMEX) ===
Company Name	Ticker
Sinovac Biotech	SVA
Tiens Biotech Group	TBV

=== Over-the-Counter (OTC)/Pink Sheets ===
Company Name	ticker
Brilliance Auto	BCAHY
Lenovo Group	LNVGY

== Canada ==
=== Toronto Stock Exchange ===
Sino-Forest Corporation	TRE

== Europe ==
=== London Stock Exchange (LSE) ===
Company Name	ticker	Market
EBT Mobile China	EBT	Alternative Investment Market/AIM

=== Euronext ===
Company Name	ticker	Segment
China Corn Oil	ALCCO	Alternext
Huacheng Real Estate	ALHUA	Alternext
China Super Power	MLCSP	Marché Libre
Easson Telecom	MLEAS	Marché Libre
Lionax	MLION	Marché Libre
Vestasia	MLVES	Marché Libre
World Art Net	MLWAN	Marché Libre

=== Frankfurt Stock Exchange (Frankfurter Wertpapierbörse/FWB) ===
Company Name	ticker	Transparency Level
Gongyou Machines	GMU	Open Market
UFC Holding	UL8	Open Market
Sino International Logistic	LA7	Open Market
ZhongDe Waste Technology	ZEF	Prime Standard
Classic Dream Properties	5CD	Open Market
Asian Bamboo	5AB	Prime Standard
Greater China Precision Components	49G	Entry Standard
EcoInvest Holding	5EI	Open Market
IBMC China	4IB	Open Market
Nitestar Holding	5NS	Open Market
Shigo Asia	A5G	Entry Standard
Business Media China	BMQ	Prime Standard

== Asia ==
=== Hong Kong Stock Exchange (HKEx) ===
Company Name	ticker

=== Tokyo Stock Exchange (TSE) ===
Company Name	ticker	Marketplace
Asia Media	2149	Mothers
China Boqi Environmental Solutions Technology	1412	First Section

=== Singapore Exchange (SGX) ===
Company Name	ticker
8Telecom International Holdings Co. Ltd.	E25

== See also ==
- A share
- B share
- H share
- Red chip
- P chip
- S chip
- N share
- L share
- G share
- China Concepts Stock
- S chips scandals
