= Purple chip =

Purple chip stock is a kind of stock in Hong Kong which is both blue chip (Hang Seng Index constituents) and red chip (state controlled companies incorporated outside of Mainland China) stock listed in Hong Kong Stock Exchange.

== Examples of "purple chip" stocks ==
- China Merchants Holdings (International)
- CITIC Pacific
- China Resources
- China Unicom
- China National Offshore Oil Corporation
- China Netcom
- China Mobile
- COSCO Pacific (2003–2014)

== See also ==
- Chip
- Green chip
- P chip
- S chip
