= Red Star Auto =

Chinese car manufacturer

- Industry: Automotive
- Founded: 2002; 24 years ago
- Fate: Acquired by Shuanghuan Auto until 2016

The Red Star Auto Manufacturing Company (红星汽车制造公司) is an automobile manufacturer located in Shijiazhuang, Hebei, People's Republic of China. The company was founded in 1912 under the name Red Star Automobile Works. In its early days the manufacturer was owned by the state.

In 2002 Red Star (红星) was bought from the Shijiazhuang ShuangHuan Automobile Co., Ltd. Since that time ShuangHuan continues the Red Star name. Currently models produced by Red Star are the Red Star Noble and the Shuanghuan SCEO. The Red Star vehicles can be distinguished on the brand logo and/or on the Vehicle Identification Number. Red Star is using the code LHA. The third model, a minivan named Red Star HX5028 was placed in autumn 2015. It was specially created for agricultural use. For city use it is also available as a fully electric panel van.

In addition to automotive production, the company maintains a network of dealers and repair shops under its Red Star brand name, which can be found in many cities of Hebei province.
