= Wheego Technologies =

US company

Autonomous Fusion, Inc.
- Formerly: Wheego Electric Cars; Wheego Technologies
- Type: Private
- Industry: Autonomous vehicle software
- Founded: June 2009; 17 years ago
- Headquarters: Atlanta, Georgia
- Key people: Mike McQuary (CEO)
- Products: Wheego Whip; Wheego LiFe

Autonomous Fusion (formerly Wheego Technologies) is an American autonomous vehicle company headquartered in Atlanta, Georgia. The company develops vehicle technologies including software, systems, tools for autonomous vehicles and self-driving cars, artificial intelligence (AI) /machine learning (ML), and IoT (Internet of Things) connected devices for the home, business and roadway environments. The company is led by CEO Mike McQuary.

== History ==
Autonomous Fusion began as electric car company Wheego Electric Cars in June 2009 as a spin-out from Rough and Tuff Electric Vehicles (RTEV), a manufacturer of battery-powered recreational electric vehicles. The company initially produced two models: the Wheego Whip and Wheego LiFe. In 2015, Wheego shifted focus to developing tools and systems for autonomous vehicles. In 2016, the company name was changed to Wheego Technologies. In 2018, the name was changed to Autonomous Fusion. The company maintains offices in Atlanta, Georgia, and Sonoma, California.

Autonomous Fusion logo as Wheego Technologies from 2016 to 2018.

== Products ==
=== Wheego Whip ===
Wheego Electric Cars' first automobile was the Whip, a two-seat compact car launched in the United States in August 2009, developed in partnership with Shuanghuan Auto. The vehicle is based on the Shuanghuan Noble platform, manufactured by Shuanghuan in China, with final assembly — including the electric motor, drive train, controller, electronic components, and programming — completed in the United States. The Whip was marketed exclusively by Wheego in North America, Japan, and the Caribbean as either a low-speed vehicle (maximum speed of 25 mph / 40 km/h) or a medium-speed vehicle (35 mph / 56 km/h), depending on local state regulations.

=== Wheego LiFe ===
Wheego Electric Cars' second automobile was the LiFe, a highway-capable electric vehicle equipped with a lithium iron phosphate (LiFePO_{4}) battery pack. The LiFe began selling in April 2011 and ceased production in 2013. Similar in form to the Whip, the LiFe was a small-sized car sourced from China and fitted with an electric drivetrain and batteries installed in California. It was powered by a 60 horsepower (45 kW) electric synchronous induction motor connected to a 60 kilowatt-hour (kWh) lithium battery pack.

Priced at US$32,995, the LiFe was marketed primarily as a commuter vehicle. It became the third all-electric, highway-speed, street-legal car available for sale in the United States, following the Tesla Roadster and the Nissan Leaf. The LiFe was electronically limited to a top speed of 65 mph (105 km/h) and had an advertised range of approximately 100 miles (161 km) on a single charge. Charging was supported via either a standard 120 V household connection or an industry-standard SAE J1772 Level 2 Charging Station.

== Autonomous Vehicle Technologies ==
Following its 2015 strategic pivot, the company focused on developing software platforms, sensor integration tools, and AI/ML systems for autonomous and semi-autonomous vehicle applications. The IoT product line extends these capabilities to connected infrastructure environments, including smart home devices, commercial building systems, and intelligent roadway sensors. Since 2018, the company operates under the Autonomous Fusion brand, reflecting its expanded scope beyond electric vehicle manufacturing.
