= Wheego LiFe =

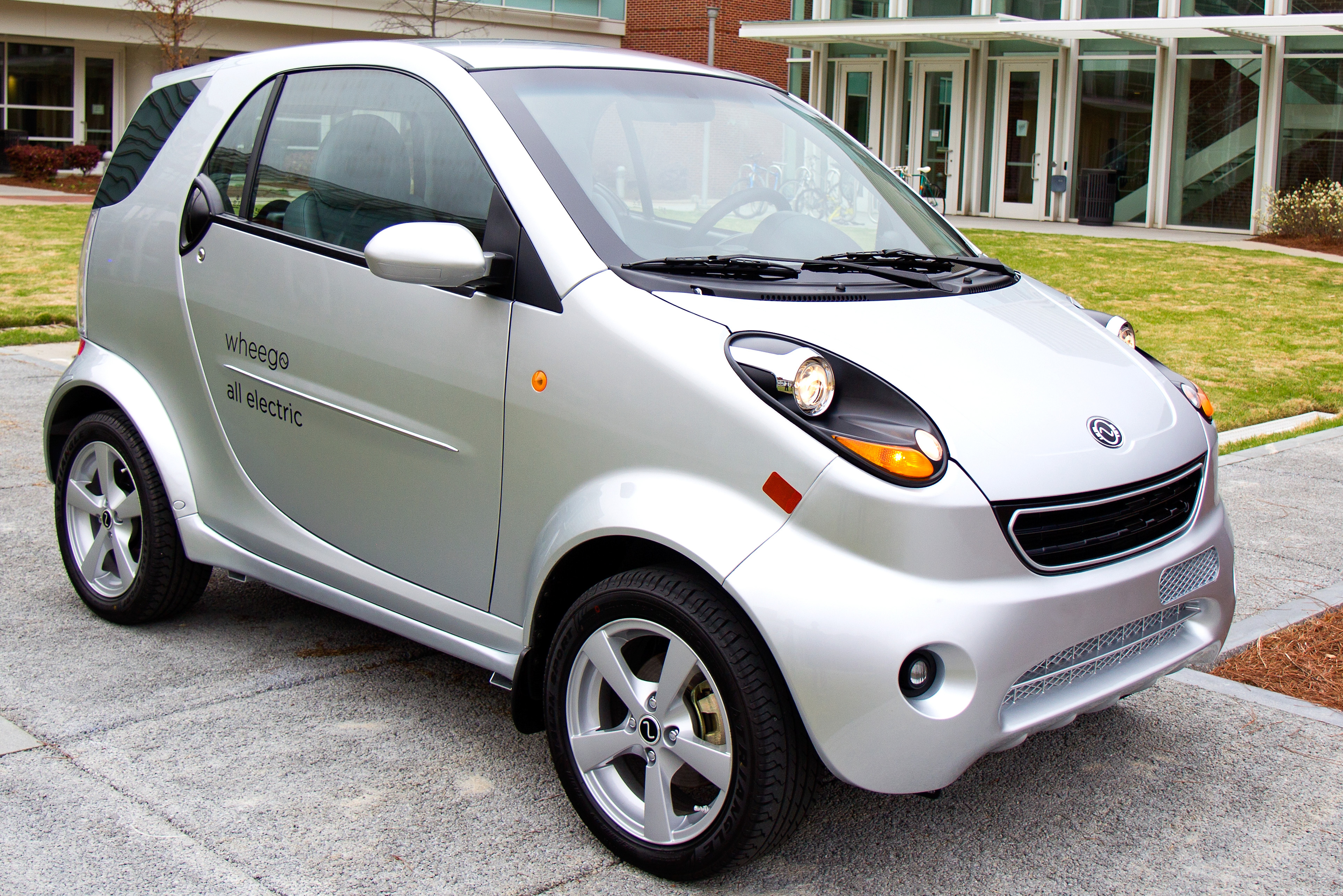

Overview
- Manufacturer: Wheego Technologies; Shuanghuan Auto
- Production: 2011–2013
- Assembly: Shijiazhuang, Hebei, China; Corona, California, United States

Body and chassis
- Body style: 2-door hatchback
- Platform: Shuanghuan Noble

Powertrain
- Electric motor: Electric motor (45 kW (60 hp))
- Battery: Battery (30 kWh lithium iron phosphate battery)
- Range: 100 mi (160 km)

Dimensions
- Wheelbase: 2,025 mm (79.7 in)
- Length: 3,010 mm (119 in)
- Width: 1,605 mm (63.2 in)
- Height: 1,600 mm (63 in)
- Curb weight: 1,210 kg (2,670 lb)

The Wheego LiFe is an electric city car produced by American automobile manufacturer Wheego Technologies.

The LiFe was based on the bodyshell of the Shuanghuan Noble produced in China with its electric drivetrain assembled in the United States. The Wheego LiFe was unveiled at the 2010 Los Angeles Auto Show and was sold in the United States at a price of US$32,995 before any applicable tax credits and other incentives. The Wheego LiFe was built with a 30 kWh lithium-iron phosphate battery pack and had an all-electric range of 100 miles (160 km). The first delivery took place in April 2011 to a customer in Atlanta. A combined total of approximately 400 LiFes and Whips were sold through 2013, after which production ceased.

== History ==
Wheego Electric Cars Inc. was formed as a spin out from RTEV (Ruff & Tuff Electric Vehicles) in June 2009 and its first automobile was a two-seat compact car under the Wheego Whip name in North America and marketed by Shuanghuan Auto in China as the E-Noble, its brand name for the rest of the world. In the U.S. it was to be launched in August 2009 as a low-speed vehicle with a top speed of 25 mph (40 km/h) or as a Medium Speed Vehicle with a maximum speed of 35 mph (56 km/h), depending on local state regulations. These versions used dry cell sealed AGM lead–acid batteries, with an all-electric range of 50 miles (80 km) on a single charge, and capable of recharging on any standard household 110 or 220-volt electrical outlet.

== Production and sales ==
The chassis was that of the Shuanghuan Noble, which was imported from China and reinforced to comply with National Highway Traffic Safety Administration standards in Wheego's U.S. assembly plant. Final assembly took place in Corona, California. Around 73% of the vehicle was composed of American products, giving it a high domestic content rating.

The first LiFe was delivered to a customer in Atlanta, Georgia on April 22 (Earth Day), 2011. As of March 2012, the company had manufactured 36 cars, and only two cars were left in inventory. Wheego's business strategy was to build the vehicles only when the company got revenue from sales or through venture capital. According to technical staff at Wheego, fewer than 100 LiFes were produced in total.

== Specifications ==
The 2011 Wheego LiFe had the following specifications:

- Battery: 30 kWh (36 3.2 V cells at 260 Ah) lithium iron phosphate battery pack.
- Motor: Nominal 15 kW (20 hp), peak horsepower 45 kW (60 hp)
- Range: 100 mi (160 km)
- Torque: 95 lb⋅ft (129 N⋅m)
- Charge capable: 120 V and 240 V
- Charging time: From 50% SoC to 100% Soc 5 hours with Level 2 charging system
- On-board charge port: J1772 compliant
- Top speed: 65 miles per hour (105 km/h) at 8,500 rpm
