= Visn =

VISN or Visn may refer to:

- VISN, the NASDAQ ticker symbol for Visionchina Media, Inc.
- Veterans Integrated Service Network, a US veterans regional health-care system
- Vision Interfaith Satellite Network, a religious television network
