= N-Shares =

Chinese companies listed on New York markets

N-Shares (Chinese: N股) refers to Chinese companies listed on the NYSE, NASDAQ, or the NYSE MKT. The term stands for New York. They may or may not be incorporated in China, but they have their main business operations in mainland China. Most of them are incorporated in Bermuda, the Cayman Islands, the British Virgin Islands, Nevada or Delaware. If they have been incorporated in mainland China, they trade as ADRs of H Shares. If they have been incorporated in Hong Kong, they trade as ADRs of Red chips. If they have been incorporated in Nevada, Delaware or Florida, they might have originated as reverse mergers. Most N-Shares are the American exchange equivalent of P-Chips.

However, the term N-Shares may only refer to private sector Chinese companies incorporated outside China, which excludes ADRs of H Shares or Red chips.

As of December 2010, the SEC is investigating frauds by publicly traded Chinese companies.

== N-Shares listed on the NYSE ==
- Acorn International, Inc. (NYSE: ATV) (Cayman Islands)
- Alibaba Group Holding Limited (NYSE: BABA) (Cayman Islands)
- Aluminum Corp Of China Ltd (NYSE: ACH) (China) (ADR of H share)
- American Oriental Bioengineering Inc. (NYSE: AOB) (Nevada)
- China Digital TV Holding Co., Ltd. (NYSE: STV) (Cayman Islands)
- China Life Insurance (NYSE: LFC) (China) (ADR of H share)
- China Mobile Ltd (NYSE: CHL) (Hong Kong) (ADR of Red chip)
- China National Offshore Oil Corp Ltd (NYSE: CEO)
- China Nepstar Chain Drugstore Ltd. (NYSE: NPD)
- China Petroleum & Chemical Corp (NYSE: SNP)
- China Southern Airlines Co Ltd (NYSE: ZNH)
- China Telecom Corp Ltd (NYSE: CHA)
- China Unicom Ltd (NYSE: CHU)
- China Yuchi International Limited (NYSE: CYD)
- E-House (China) Holdings Limit (NYSE: EJ)
- General Steel Holdings Inc (NYSE: GSI)
- Giant Interactive Group Inc. (NYSE: GA)
- Guangshen Railway Co Ltd (NYSE: GSH)
- Gushan Environmental Energy Ltd (NYSE: GU)
- Huaneng Power International Inc (NYSE: HNP)
- Ldk Solar Co., Ltd. (NYSE: LDK)
- Mindray Medical International Limited (NYSE: MR)
- New Oriental Education & Technology Group (NYSE: EDU)
- Nio (NYSE: NIO)
- Noah Education Holdings Ltd. (NYSE: NED)
- Petrochina Co Ltd (NYSE: PTR)
- Qiao Xing Mobile Communication Co., Ltd. (NYSE: QXM)
- Rene Sola Ltd (NYSE: SOL)
- Semiconductor Manufacturing International (NYSE: SMI)
- Simcere Pharmaceutical Group (NYSE: SCR)
- Sinopec Shanghai Petrochemical Co Ltd (NYSE: SHI)
- Suntech Power (NYSE: STP)
- Trina Solar Limited (Trina) (NYSE: TSL)
- Vance Info Technologies Inc. (NYSE: VIT)
- Wsp Holdings Ltd (NYSE: WH)
- Wuxi Pharma Tech (Cayman) Inc (NYSE: WX)
- Xinyuan Real Estate Co Ltd (NYSE: XIN)
- Yanzhou Coal Mining Co Ltd (NYSE: YZC)
- Yingli Green Energy Holding Company Limited (NYSE: YGE)

== N-Shares listed on NASDAQ ==
- 3Sbio Inc. (Nasdaq: SSRX)
- 51Job Inc. (Nasdaq: JOBS)
- Actions Semiconductor Co., Ltd. (Nasdaq: ACTS)
- Airmedia Group Inc. (Nasdaq: AMCN)
- Asiainfo Holdings Inc. (Nasdaq: ASIA)
- Ata Inc. (Nasdaq: ATAI)
- Baidu.Com, Inc. (Nasdaq: BIDU)
- Canadian Solar Inc (Headquartered in Ontario, manufacturing operations in China). (Nasdaq: CSIQ)
- China Automotive Systems Inc. (Nasdaq: CAAS)
- China Bak Battery, Inc. (Nasdaq: CBAK)
- China Direct Industries, Inc (Nasdaq: CDII)
- China Finance Online Co. Ltd. (Nasdaq: JRJC)
- China Grentech Corp. Ltd. (Nasdaq: GRRF)
- China Medical Technologies Inc. (Nasdaq: CMED)
- China Natural Resources, Inc. (Nasdaq: CHNR)
- China Precision Steel, Inc. (Nasdaq: CPSL)
- China Sky One Medical, Inc. (Nasdaq: CSKI)
- China Sunergy Co., Ltd. (Nasdaq: CSUND)
- China Techfaith Wireless Communication T (Nasdaq: CNTF)
- China Technology Development Group Corpo (Nasdaq: CTDC)
- Chinacast Education Corp (delisted) (Nasdaq: CAST)
- Chinaedu Corp (Nasdaq: CEDU)
- Cninsure Inc. (Nasdaq: CISG)
- Comtech Group Inc. (Nasdaq: COGO)
- Ctrip.Com International Ltd (Nasdaq: CTRP)
- E-Future Information Technology Inc. (Nasdaq: EFUT)
- Elong Inc. (Nasdaq: LONG)
- Focus Media Holding (Nasdaq: FMCN)
- Fushi Copperweld, Inc. (Nasdaq: FSIN)
- Fuwei Films (Holdings) Co., Ltd. (Nasdaq: FFHL)
- Global Sources Ltd. (Nasdaq: GSOL)
- Hanwha Solarone Co., Ltd. (Nasdaq: HSOL)
- Home Inns & Hotels Management Inc. (Nasdaq: HMIN)
- Ja Solar Holdings Co., Ltd. (Nasdaq: JASO)
- JD.com, Inc. (Nasdaq: JD)
- Kandi Technologies Corp (Nasdaq: KNDI)
- Kongzhong Corp. (Nasdaq: KONG)
- Ku6 Media Co. Ltd. (Nasdaq: KUTV)
- Linktone Ltd (Nasdaq: LTON)
- Melco Pbl Entertainment (Macau) Limited (Nasdaq: MPEL)
- Netease.Com (Nasdaq: NTES)
- Ninetowns Internet Technology Group Comp (Nasdaq: NINE)
- Origin Agritech Limited (Nasdaq: SEED)
- Perfect World Co Ltd (Nasdaq: PWRD)
- Qiao Xing Universal Telephone, Inc. (Nasdaq: XING)
- Shanda Interactive Entertainment Ltd (Nasdaq: SNDA)
- Sina Corporation (Nasdaq: SINA)
- Sohu Com Inc (Nasdaq: SOHU)
- Sorl Auto Parts Inc (Nasdaq: SORL)
- Spreadtrum Communications, Inc. (Nasdaq: SPRD)
- Sutor Technology Group Ltd (Nasdaq: SUTR)
- Telestone Technologies Corp (Nasdaq: TSTC)
- The9 Limited (Nasdaq: NCTY)
- Vimicro International Corporation (Nasdaq: VIMC)
- Visionchina Media Inc. (Nasdaq: VISN)
- Yucheng Technologies Limited (Nasdaq: YTEC)
- Maase Inc. (Nasdaq: MAAS)

== N-Shares listed on the NYSE MKT ==
- China Shenghuo Pharmaceutical Holdings (AMEX: KUN)
- Jinpan International Ltd. (AMEX: JST)
- Minco Gold Corp (AMEX: MGH)
- Sinovac Biotech Ltd (AMEX: SVA)

== See also ==
- Chip
- A share
- B share
- H share
- Red chip
- P chip
- S chip
- N share
- L share
- G share
- China Concepts Stock
- S-Chips Scandals
