= Wheego Whip =

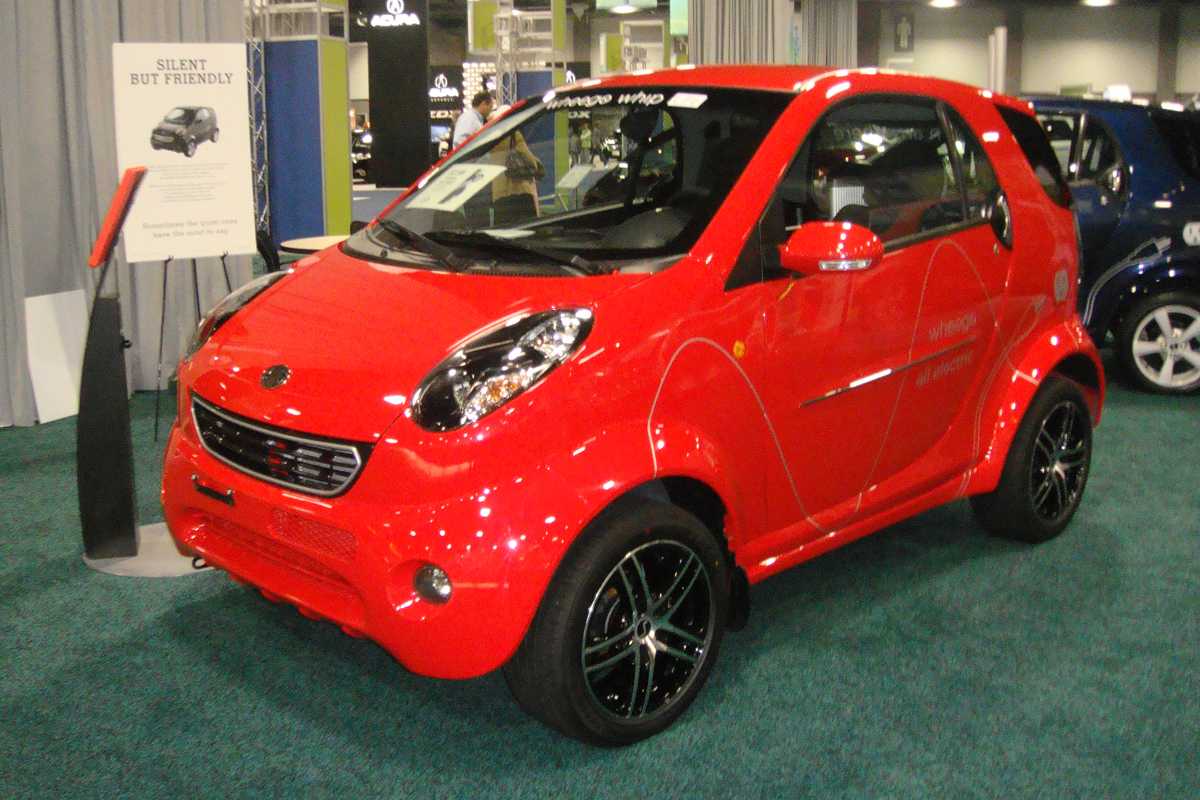
- Wheego Whip at the 2010 Washington Auto Show

Overview
- Manufacturer: Shuanghuan Auto and Wheego Technologies
- Also called: Shuanghuan E-Noble
- Production: 2011–2013
- Assembly: Shijiazhuang, Hebei, China

Body and chassis
- Body style: 2-door hatchback
- Related: Shuanghuan Noble

Powertrain
- Electric motor: 13.0 kW (17.5 hp)
- Battery: 16.32 kWh dry cell lead-acid
- Range: 40 mi (64 km)

Dimensions
- Wheelbase: 2,025 mm (79.7 in)
- Length: 3,010 mm (118.5 in)
- Width: 1,605 mm (63.2 in)
- Height: 1,600 mm (63.0 in)
- Curb weight: 1,210 kg (2,667 lb)

The Wheego Whip was an electric city car produced by American automobile manufacturer Wheego Technologies. It was a low-speed vehicle with a top speed of 25 mph (40 km/h) or as a medium-speed vehicle with a maximum speed of 35 mph (56 km/h), depending on local state regulations. The Whip was based on the bodyshell of the Shuanghuan Noble produced in China, where it was sold as the Shuanghuan E-Noble. The Whip and a highway-capable version, the Wheego LiFe, were produced from 2011 to 2013, with a total of approximately 300 units being completed when production ceased.

== History ==
Wheego Electric Cars Inc. was formed as a spin out from RTEV (Ruff & Tuff Electric Vehicles) in June 2009, having formed a partnership with Chinese car manufacturer Shuanghuan Auto, with the Whip as its first automobile. It was based on the Shuanghuan Noble, a two-seat city car produced by Shuanghuan since 2004 controversial for its similarity to the Smart Fortwo. In the United States it was to be launched in August 2009 as a low-speed vehicle with a top speed of 25 mph (40 km/h) or as a Medium Speed Vehicle with a maximum speed of 35 mph (56 km/h), depending on local state regulations. These versions used dry cell sealed AGM lead–acid batteries, with an all-electric range of 80 kilometres (50 mi) on a single charge, and capable of recharging on any standard household 110 or 220-volt electrical outlet. The bodyshell was produced by Shuanghuan in China was then fitted with the electric drivetrain. The vehicle was marketed under the Wheego Whip name in North America and the Shuanghuan E-Noble in the rest of the world.

== Production and sales ==
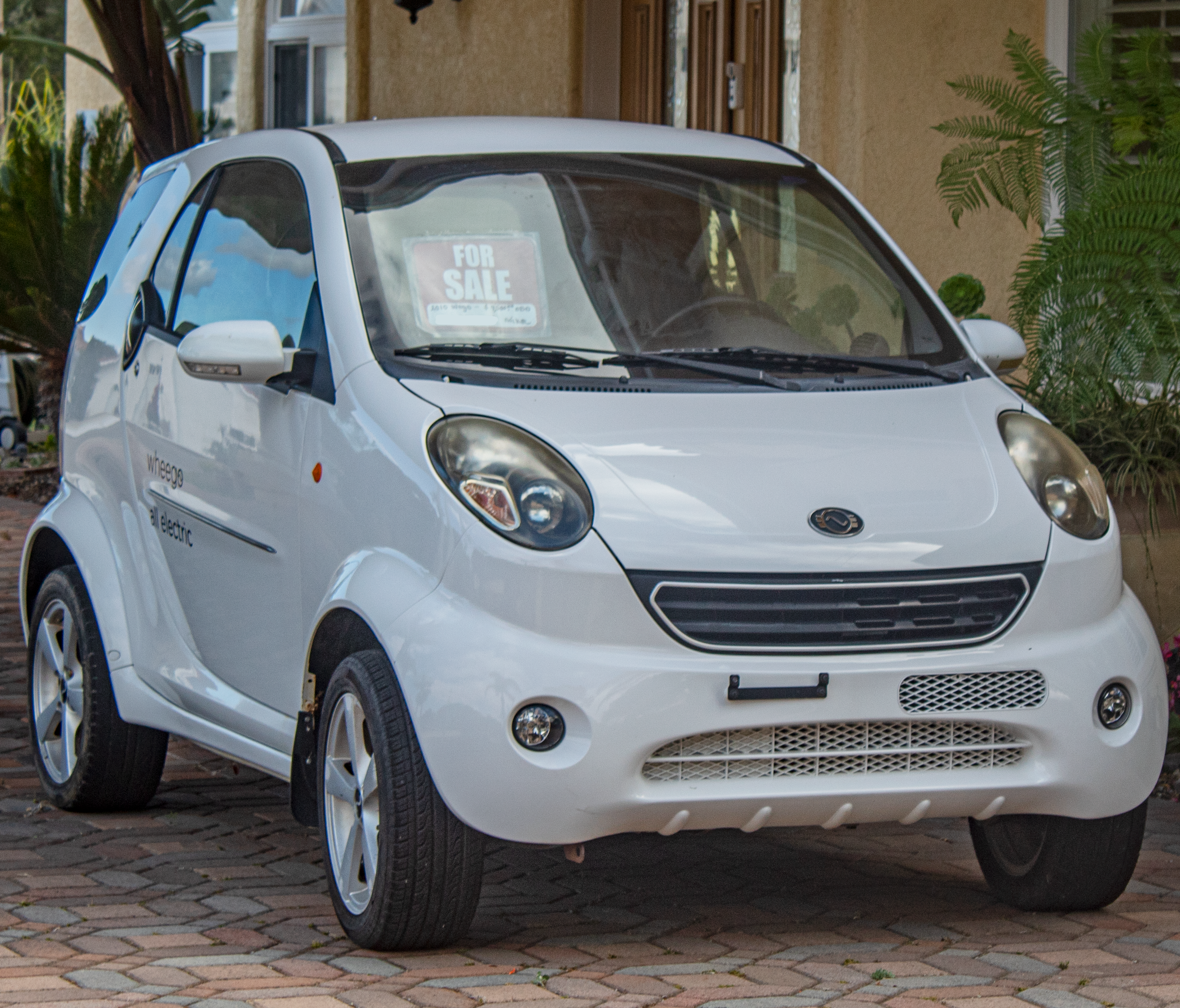
Wheego Whip in white

As of March 2012, Wheego had manufactured 36 cars since April 2011, and only two cars were left in inventory. Wheego's business strategy was to build the cars only when the company gets money from sales or through venture capital. About 400 units were sold through 2013, of which 300 were completed when production ended.

== See also ==
- List of modern production plug-in electric vehicles
- List of production battery electric vehicles
- Government incentives for plug-in electric vehicles
- Zero-emissions vehicle
