= SUNGEN International Limited =

Anwell Technologies Limited

- Industry: Manufacturing and trading
- Founded: 2008
- Headquarters: Hong Kong
- Key people: Patrick Lam, Managing Director
- Products: Solar Panels
- Number of employees: around 30 (2009)
- Website: www.sungen.com

SUNGEN International Limited is a subsidiary of Anwell Technologies Limited, with trading and manufacturing business in solar photovoltaics panels and modules.

== Overview ==
SUNGEN has a thin film solar module production facility in Henan, China using Anwell Solar’s manufacturing technologies. The facility will be used to produce 1.1 by 1.4 meter a-Si thin-film photovoltaic modules, at an initial annual capacity of 40MW in 2010.

In March 2010, the Group announced the mass production of thin film solar modules at SUNGEN’s manufacturing base in Henan China using Anwell Solar’s thin film solar module production line.

It produces and markets the SUNGEN branded photovoltaic modules to a portfolio of installers, distributors, as well as architectural and building firms around the world.

== See also ==
- China Sunergy
