= Red chip =

Type of Chinese company

Red chip stocks (Chinese: 红筹股; pinyin: hóng chóu gǔ; Jyutping: hung^{4} chau^{4} gu^{2}) are the stocks of mainland China companies incorporated outside mainland China (often Hong Kong or a British Overseas Territory) and listed in the Stock Exchange of Hong Kong. It refers to businesses based in mainland China and with (majority) shares controlled either directly or indirectly by a government body. This controlling entity could be one or more combinations of the central, provincial or municipal mainland government, with the company listed in Hong Kong to allow private and overseas investment.

The term was coined by Hong Kong economist Alex Tang in 1992 and combines blue chip stocks with "red" representing the socialist economic philosophy of the People's Republic of China.

== Stock index of red chips ==
The Hang Seng China-Affiliated Corporations Index (HSCCI) is a stock market index of 25 red chip companies.

== List of red chip companies ==
As of 30 September 2020, there were 267 red chip companies, including:

- APT Satellite Holdings
- China Aerospace International Holdings
- China Development Bank International Investment
- China Energine
- China Mobile Ltd
- China Overseas Land and Investment
- China Petroleum & Chemical Corporation
- China Resources Enterprise
- China Telecom Corp., Ltd.
- China Unicom (Hong Kong) Limited
- China Zheshang Bank
- Chongqing Iron and Steel Company
- Cosco Shipping
- Goldwind
- Guangzhou Automobile Group Co Ltd
- Lenovo
- Peking University Resources (Holdings)
- PetroChina
- SMIC
- Tong Ren Tang
- Tsingtao Brewery
- Zijin Mining Group
- ZTE Corporation

== See also ==
- Chip
- A share
- B share
- H share
- Green Chip
- P chip
- S chip
- N share
- L share
- G share
- China Concepts Stock
