= Martin Motors =

Automobile Company

Martin Motors, S.p.A.
- Industry: Automotive
- Founded: 2006
- Founder: Giuseppe Martinelli
- Defunct: 2015 (Bankruptcy)
- Headquarters: Quinto de' Stampi, Milan, Italy
- Products: Automobiles
- Website: www.martinmotors.it

Martin Motors S.p.A. was an Italian company headquartered in the Quinto de'Stampi district of Milan. It was established by Giuseppe Martinelli to manufacture automobiles, buses and commercial vehicles. The manufacturer's assembly plant was located in Tunisia.

On 15 January 2015, the company filed for bankruptcy.

== History ==
Martin Motors gained fame in the mid-1990s for their Allestimenti Linea and Allestimenti Turismo coaches. These had proven popular with travel agencies. Martin Motors extended the bus range in 1997 by adding the Pulmann Urbani. With a minibus, the MiniBus, the manufacturer tried to establish itself on the market of the small group buses.

Bus production was 30,000 units per year, the largest source of revenue of the manufacturer. The production line was 7,500 units per year.

Martin Motors' first attempt to establish itself in the passenger car market took place in 2006 with the Shuanghuan Noble small car, which they rebadged as the Bubble. “We want everyone to see in real life how a four-seat front-engine front-wheel drive minicar differs from a rear-engine rear-wheel drive two-seater,” said Martin Motors spokesperson Viviana Martinelli.

The following year, Martin marketed a sports utility vehicle called the Shuanghuan CEO, which, according to BMW, was a copy of the BMW E53. The CEO was the first model of the brand, sold throughout Europe.

In order to gain a foothold in other areas, Martin Motors's 2009 model initiative began with the MM520 series one, a vehicle in the compact class. As a manufacturer of microcars, the company also built the Changhe Ideal 1000 under license. Furthermore, Martin Motors brought the minivan Changhe CoolCar and the self-developed Pickup Cab Changhe Freedom in order to test the commercial vehicle waters.

Similarly, Martin Motors produced 10 different types of motorcycles with four-stroke engines have a displacement 50–205 cm^{3}, and met the Euro II emission standard.

In motorcycle manufacturing, Martin Motors produced 80,000 units annually, and served a variety of engines and automobile manufacturers. 2012, the company added the MM620 to its line-up.

== Models ==
=== Cars, Minivan and SUV ===
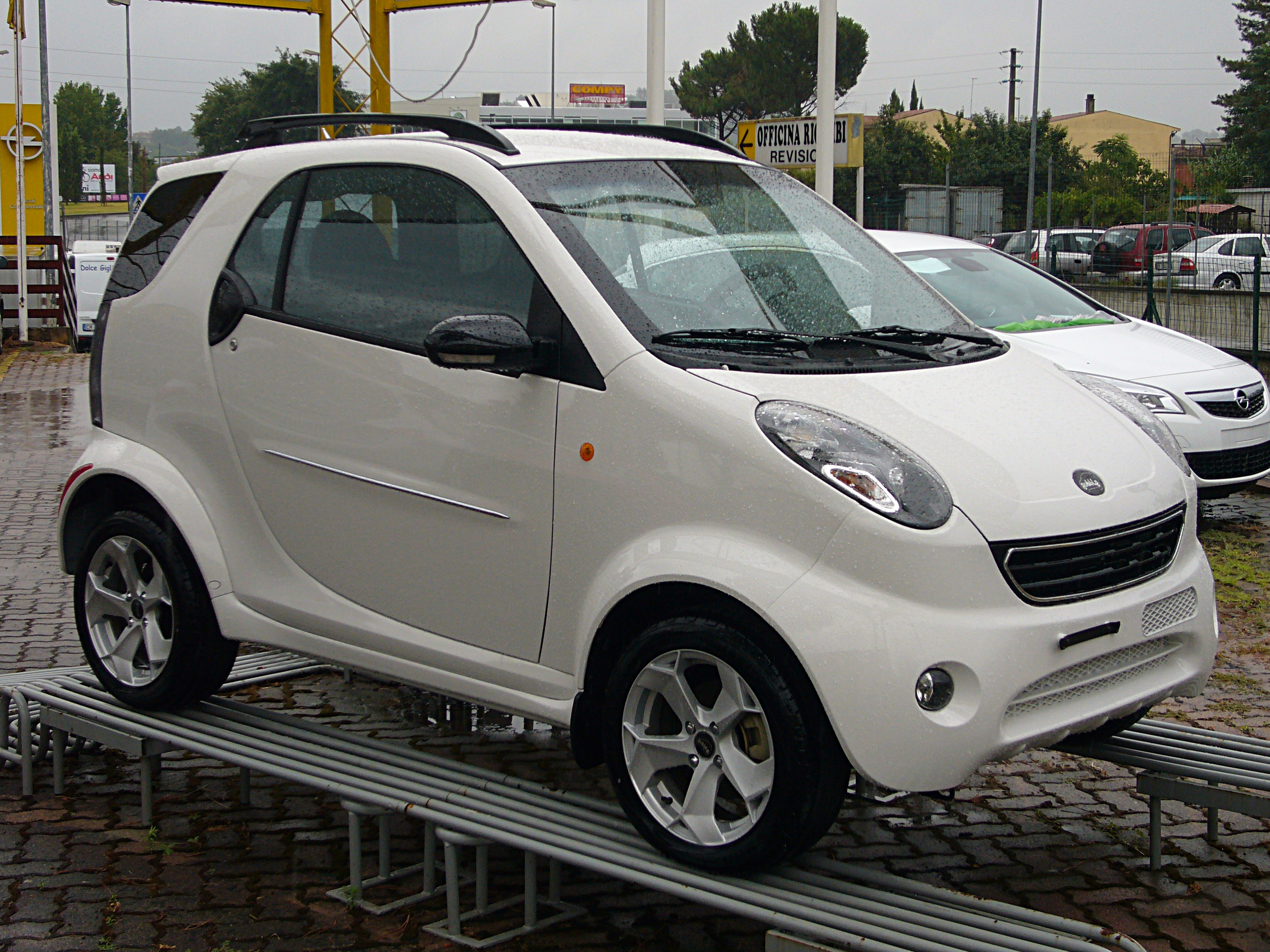
Martin Motors Bubble.

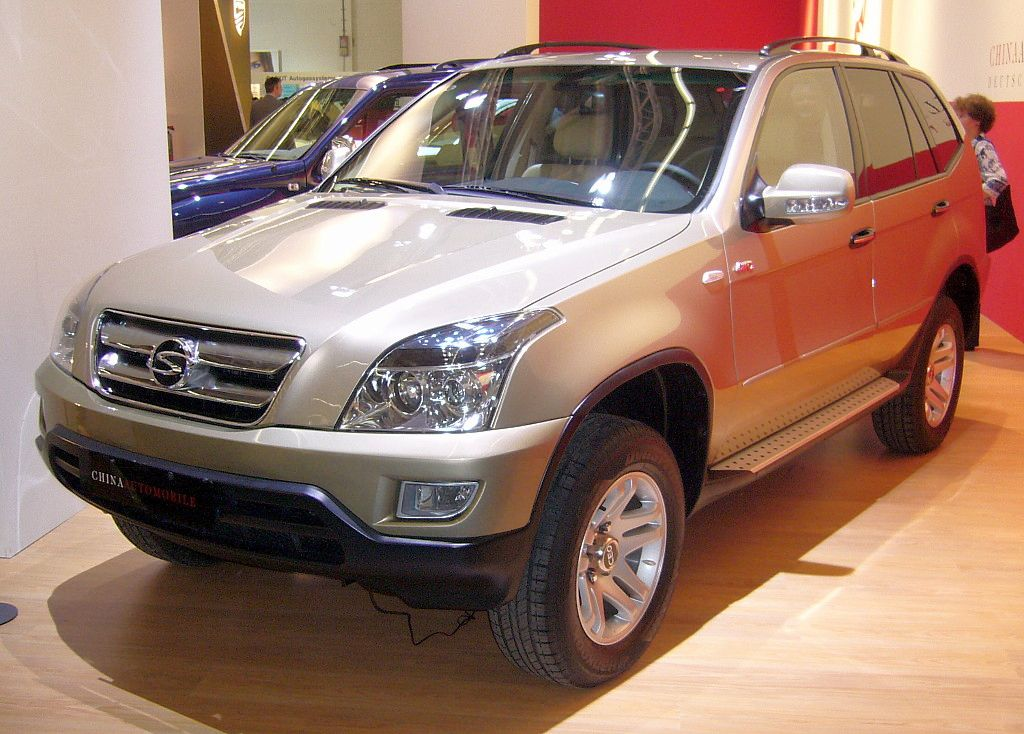
Martin Motors CEO front

- Bubble
- CEO
- CoolCar
- MM520
- MM620
- Ideal 1000
- Noble

=== Trucks ===
- Freedom Cab Duo
- Freedom Cab Mono
- Freedom Cargo
- Freedom Tri

=== Buses ===
- Allestimenti Linea
- Allestimenti Turismo
- MiniBus
- Pulmann Urbani
