= Green chip =

Green chips are stocks in a companies in "green" or environmentally friendly industries or that operate in a socially responsible manner. It is a play on the term blue chip stocks with the word "green" representing eco investing or more broadly socially responsible investing.

Green chip companies can be involved in industries such as solar energy, wind energy, geothermal, plug-in hybrid electric vehicles (PHEV), organic foods, water, carbon trading, waste-to-energy, smart grid, hydrogen fuel cells, regenerative farming and responsible banking.

== History ==
The term "green chip stocks", which refers to the publicly traded companies in the green market has been accredited to Jeff Siegel, who first used the term in 2004.

== See also ==
- Chip
- Blue chip
- Red chip
- P chip
- S chip
- Purple chip
