= CISC =

CISC may refer to:

- Caribbean Island Swimming Championships
- Chongqing Iron and Steel Company
- Clean intermittent self-catheterisation, a form of urinary catheterization
- Complex instruction set computer
- Criminal Intelligence Service Canada
- CRTC Interconnection Steering Committee
