= S-CHIP =

S-CHIP may refer to:

- State Children's Health Insurance Program
- S-Chips, Chinese companies listed on the Singapore Exchange
