= B-share (mainland China) =

B shares (Chinese: B股, officially Domestically Listed Foreign Investment Shares) on the Shanghai and Shenzhen stock exchanges refers to those that are traded in foreign currencies. Shares that are traded on the two mainland Chinese stock exchanges in Renminbi, the currency in mainland China, are called A shares.

== History ==
B shares were limited to foreign investment until 19 February 2001, when the China Securities Regulatory Commission began permitting the exchange of B shares via the secondary market to domestic citizens. This was widely seen as a landmark event to the integration of Chinese stock markets.

== Currency ==
The face values of B shares are set in Renminbi. In Shanghai, B shares are traded in US dollars, whereas in Shenzhen they are traded in Hong Kong dollars.

== See also ==
- Chip
- A share
- H share
- Red chip
- P chip
- S chip
- N share
- L share
- G share
- China Concepts Stock
