= Chongqing Iron and Steel Company =

Chinese iron and steel manufacturer

Chongqing Iron and Steel Company Limited 重庆钢铁股份有限公司
- Company type: State-owned enterprise
- Industry: Iron and steel manufacturing
- Founded: 1938
- Headquarters: Chongqing, People's Republic of China
- Area served: People's Republic of China
- Key people: Chairman: Mr. Dong Lin
- Products: Iron and steel
- Website: Chongqing Iron and Steel Company Limited

Chongqing Iron and Steel Company Limited (SEHK: 1053,SSE: 601005), or CISC is an iron and steel manufacturing state-owned enterprise in Chongqing, China.

Formerly "Hanyang Iron Plant" in Wuhan, it was established in 1890 during the Qing dynasty by Zhang Zhidong, the governor of Hu-Guang Area (now separately Hubei, Hunan and Guangdong). It, together with Daye Iron Mine and Shanghai Steel Plant, was relocated to Dadukou, Chongqing in 1938 during the Second Sino-Japanese War. After 1949, the plant had been renamed as "Chongqing Iron and Steel (Group) Company". In 1995, the company was reformed into "Chongqing Iron and Steel (Group) Company Limited".

Its H shares were listed on the Hong Kong Stock Exchange in 1997, while its A shares were listed on the Shanghai Stock Exchange in 2007.
