= Chip (stock market) =

Terminology to describe a stock of a particular quality

A chip is a terminology to describe a stock of a particular quality.

== Chip ==
Chip
Name	Description
Blue chip	Reliable company
Green chip	Company in green industry
Red chip	Mainland Chinese company listed in Hong Kong
Purple chip	Red and blue chip company
Orange chip	Penny Stock often resembling a speculative gamble rather than a stable investment
P chip	Company incorporated in the Cayman Islands, Bermuda, or the British Virgin Islands operating in China and listed in Hong Kong
S chip	Company incorporated in the Cayman Islands, Bermuda, or the British Virgin Islands operating in China and listed in Singapore

== Share ==
Share
Name	Description
A share	Company listed in Shanghai or Shenzhen and traded in renminbi
B share	Company listed in Shanghai or Shenzhen and traded in a foreign currency
G share	Company listed in China that have accomplished stock right division reform
H share	Company incorporated in mainland China listed in Hong Kong
L share	Company incorporated in the Cayman Islands, Bermuda, or the British Virgin Islands operating in China and listed in London
N share	Company operating in China and listed on NYSE or NASDAQ

== See also ==
- PHLX Semiconductor Sector, an index of microchip stocks
