= L share =

L-Shares (Chinese: L股) refers to Chinese companies listed on the London Stock Exchange. The listed companies are incorporated in the Cayman Islands, Bermuda, British Virgin Islands and Jersey, but they have their main business operations in mainland China. They are listed on the London Stock Exchange according to a memorandum of understanding signed between the UK and China's relevant authorities on October 7, 1996.

== See also ==
- Chip
- A share
- B share
- H share
- Red chip
- P chip
- S chip
- N share
- L share
- G share
- China Concepts Stock
