= Anwell Technologies =

Dissolved Hong Kongese manufacturer

Anwell Technologies Limited
- Company type: Public company
- Traded as: SGX: G5X
- Industry: Manufacturing
- Founded: 2000
- Defunct: 2019
- Headquarters: Kwai Chung, Hong Kong
- Key people: Franky Fan (chairman and CEO)
- Products: Optical discs; solar cells; OLED
- Number of employees: 2,500+ (2009)
- Website: www.anwell.com

Anwell Technologies Limited was a Hong Kong multinational manufacturing company. Founded in 2000, the company initially designed machines that mass-produced optical discs, but later began manufacturing thin-film solar cells and organic light-emitting diodes (OLEDs) as well. The company was listed on the Singapore Exchange in 2004, but delisted in 2019 as the company shut down its operations.

== History ==
Anwell was founded in 2000 by chairman and CEO Fan Kai Leung (Chinese: 范继良; pinyin: Fàn Jì Liáng), known as Franky Fan, and five other engineering partners with initial capital of US$100,000. In 2004, the company was listed on the mainboard of the Singapore Stock Exchange.

In September 2009, Anwell produced its first thin-film solar cell at their production plant located in Anyang, Henan, China. The following month, Anwell's wholly owned subsidiary Sungen signed a memorandum of understanding with American energy company Solargen to supply solar panels for their solar farm projects.

In 2011, Anwell received a total of RMB 800 million in funding from the municipal government of Dongguan for the construction of a second manufacturing base in the city, as well as RMB 700 million increase production capacity at its existing plant in Anyang.

In February 2012, Anwell secured its first engineering, procurement, and construction contract for a solar power plant in Thailand, in a deal worth US$25 million.

== Legal issues and closure ==
In November 2017, Anwell's judicial managers RSM Corporate Advisory announced that Anwell's Chinese subsidiary, Dongguan Anwell Digital Machinery, as well as Anwell CEO Fan, executive director Wu Wai Kin (known as Ken Wu), and group financial controller Kwong Chi Kit (known as Victor Kwong) were found guilty of fraud by Chinese courts. Dongguan Anwell was ordered to pay a total of RMB 1.2 billion in fines and other payments; Fan was sentenced to life imprisonment and a seizure of personal assets worth up to RMB 5 million, while Wu and Kwong were fined RMB 4 million each and sentenced to 20 and 19 years' imprisonment, respectively.

In March 2018, the Singapore High Court granted an application for the company to shut down its operations and begin the process of liquidation. The company applied to delist from the Singapore Exchange in January 2019.
