= Shuanghuan Auto =

Defunct Chinese automobile manufacturer

Shijiazhuang Shuanghuan Automobile Co., Ltd.
- Type: Private
- Industry: Automotive
- Founded: 1988; 38 years ago
- Founder: Zhao Zhigang
- Defunct: 2016; 10 years ago
- Headquarters: Shijiazhuang, China
- Products: Automobiles
- Subsidiaries: Red Star Auto Manufacturing Company
- Website: http://www.hbshauto.com/

Shuanghuan Auto
- Traditional Chinese: 石家莊雙環汽車公司
- Simplified Chinese: 石家庄双环汽车公司
- Literal meaning: Shijiazhuang Shuanghuan Automobile Co., Ltd.
Transcriptions

Shuanghuan Auto (officially Shijiazhuang Shuanghuan Automobile Co., Ltd.) (双环汽车) was a Chinese automobile manufacturer headquartered in Shijiazhuang, Hebei Province, founded by Zhao Zhigang. It was established in April 1988 and acquired the state-owned automobile manufacturer Red Star in 2002. In 2009, Shuanghuan itself was acquired by Liaoning SG Automotive Co, Ltd. Shuanghuan used the Vehicle Identification Number HBJ.

On 29 February 2016, China's Ministry of Industry and Information Technology shut down Shuanghuan and 12 other automobile manufacturers that did not meet mandatory production evaluations for two consecutive years.

== Products ==
- Shuanghuan Laifu/Shuanghuan Laiwang (来福/来旺) (HBJ6460) (1998–2003)
- Shuanghuan Laibao (来宝) (1988–1998)/Shuanghuan Rabo S-RV (1999–2010)
- Shuanghuan Jiaolian (1998–2002)
- Shuanghuan SCEO/CEO (2004–2011)
- Shuanghuan Noble/Bubble (2004–2016)
- Shuanghuan SHZJ213 (1994–1997)
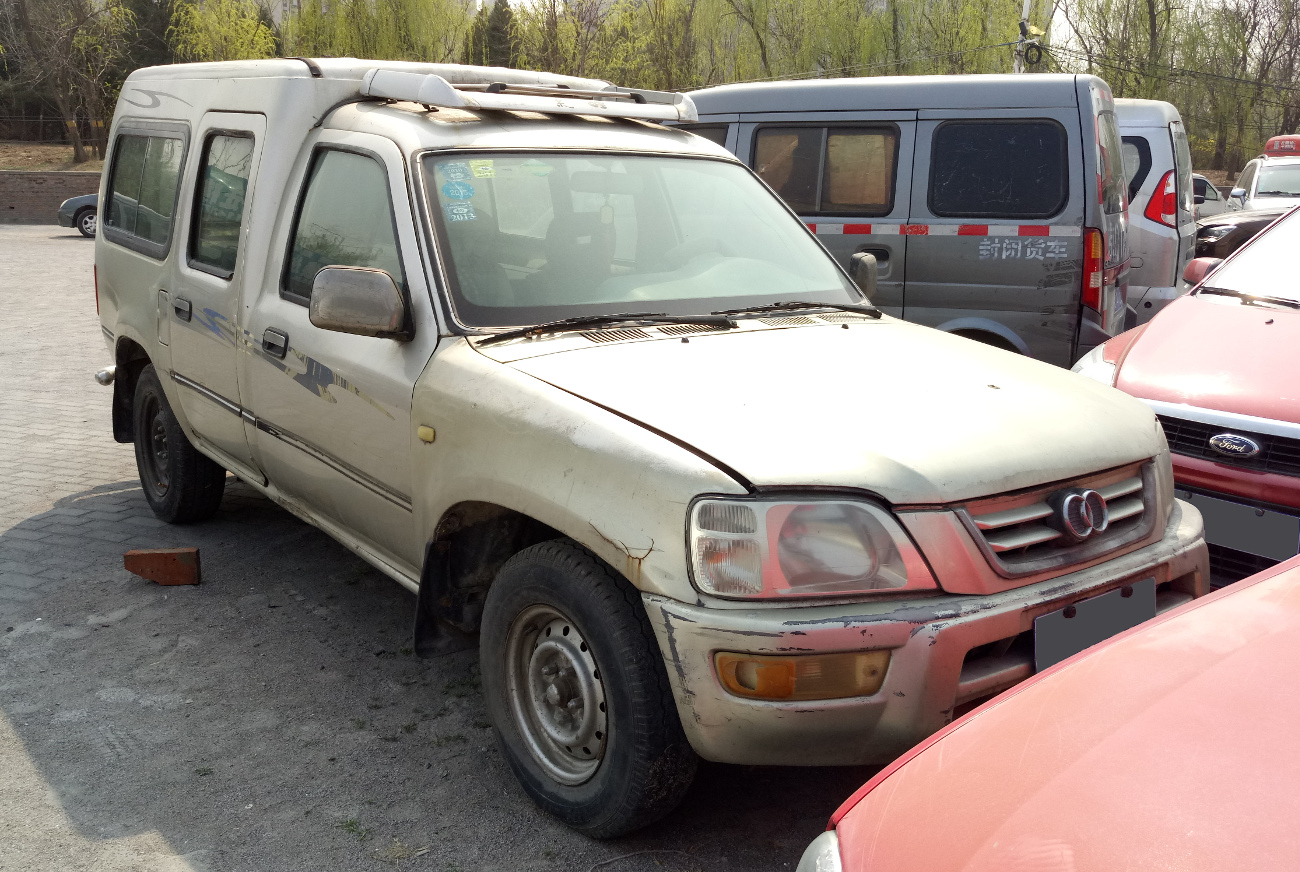
Shuanghuan Laiwang (HBJ6460)

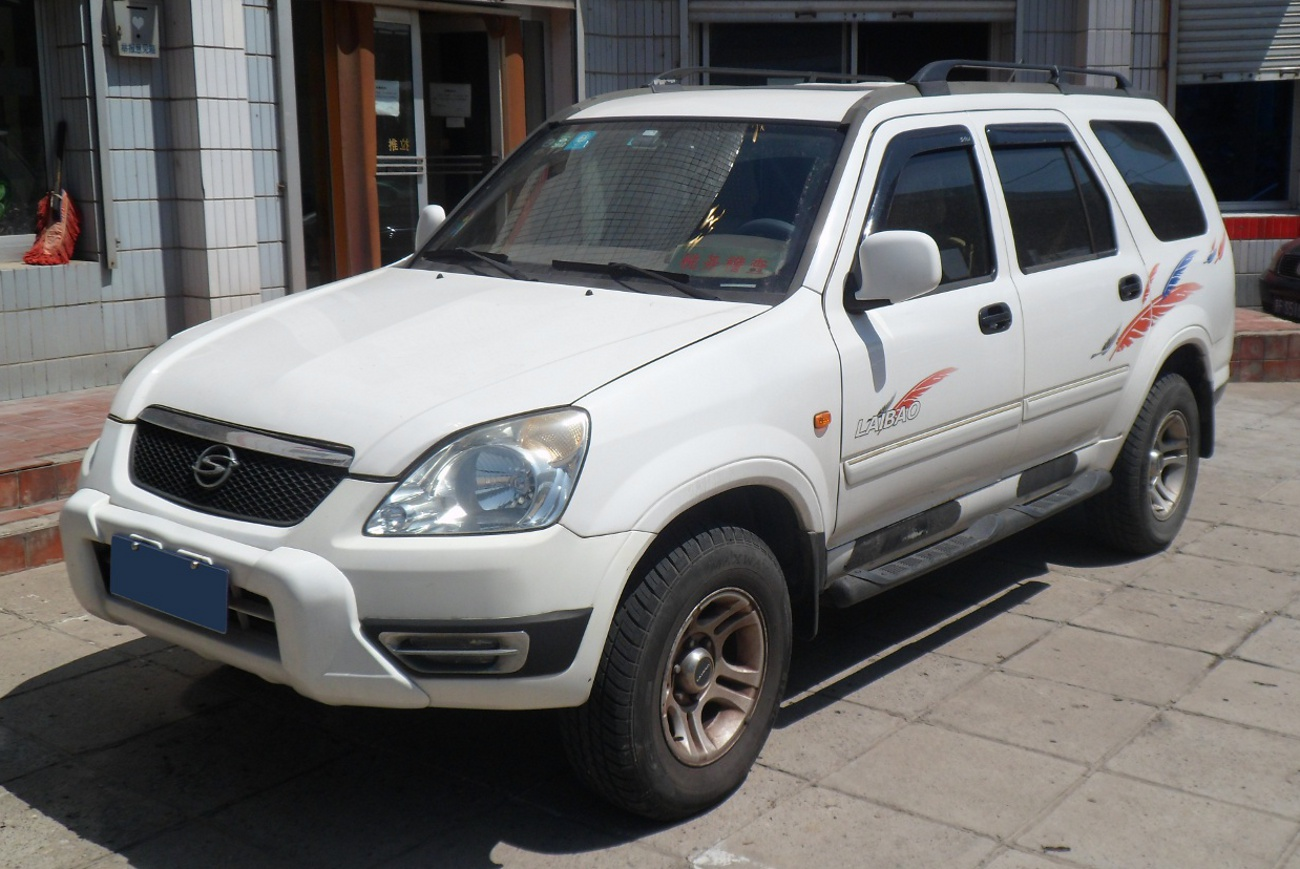
Shuanghuan Laibao S-RV (Rabo S-RV)

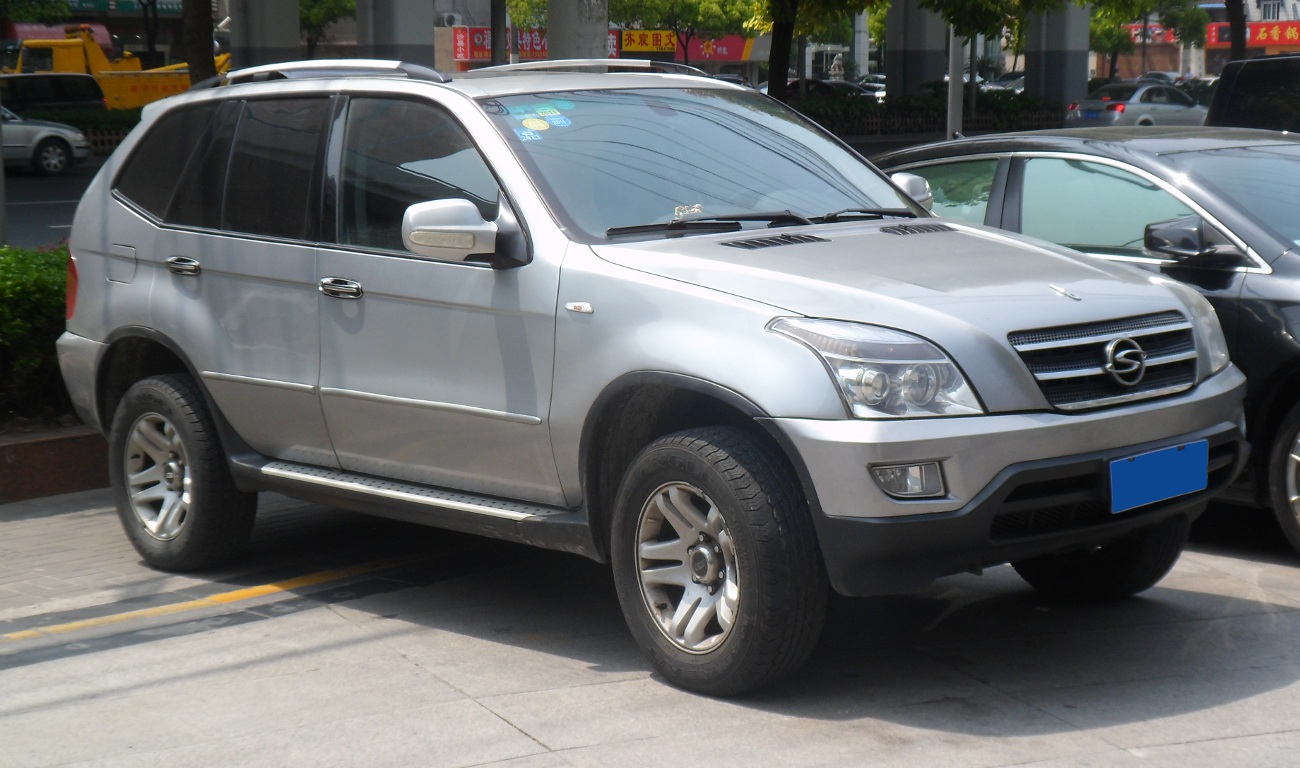
Shuanghuan CEO

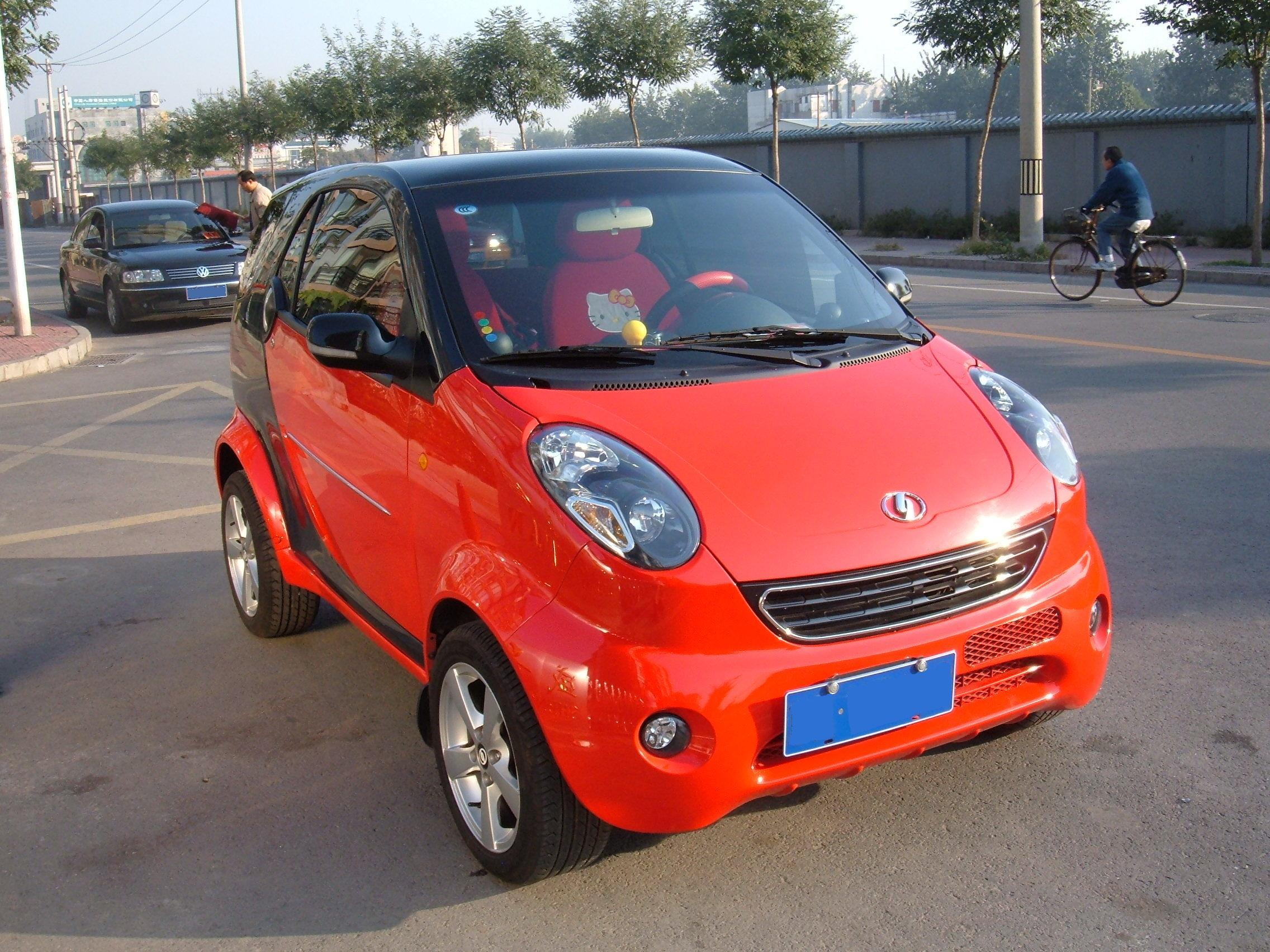
Red Noble S6

Shuanghuan and Wheego Electric Cars had a partnership for the production of electric cars. Jointly produced vehicles included:

- Wheego Whip
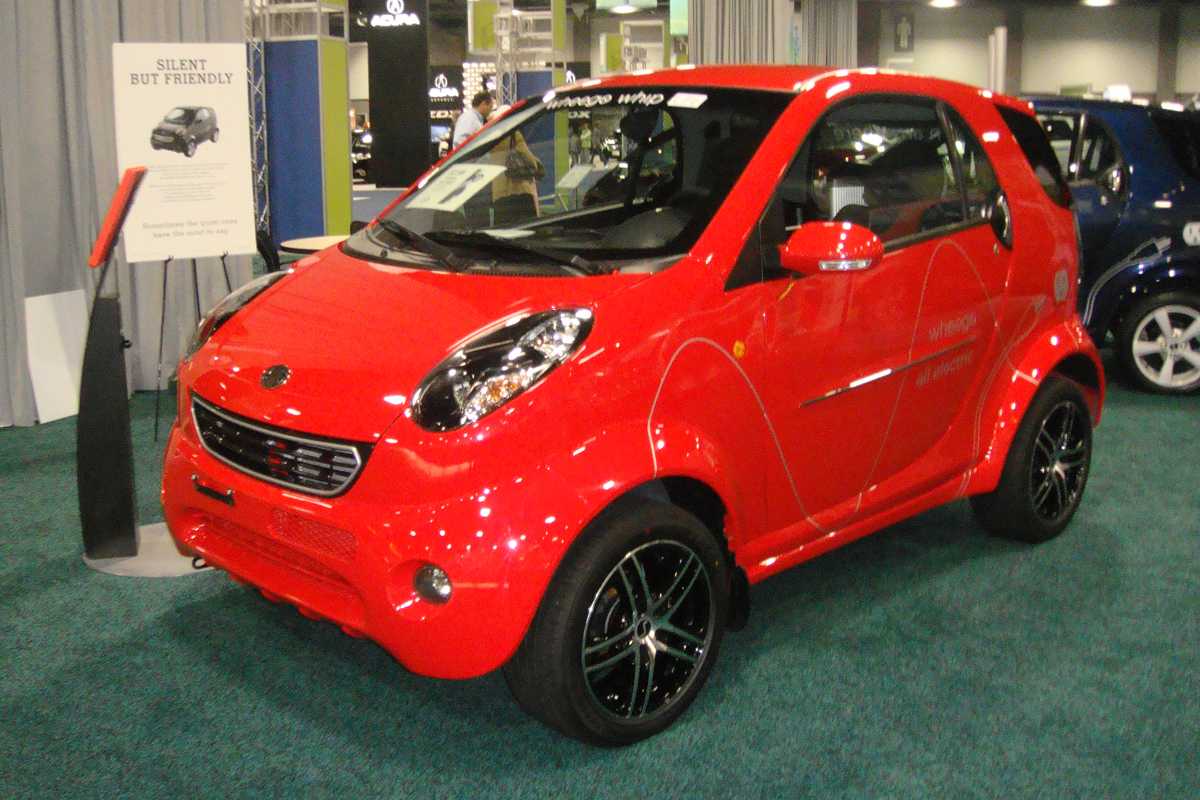
Wheego Whip

== Criticism ==
Shuanghuan was criticized and threatened with legal action for copying the Smart Fortwo and the BMW X5, along with the Honda CR-V. In Germany legal action was taken by BMW which resulted in a ban on sales of the Shuanghuan SCEO.
