= China Automotive Systems =

- Company type: Public
- Traded as: Nasdaq: CAAS
- Industry: Automotive; Automotive Parts
- Headquarters: Hubei Province, People's Republic of China
- Area served: China and North America
- Key people: Hanlin Chen (chairman); Qizhou Wu (CEO)
- Subsidiaries: HengLong USA Corporation
- Website: http://www.caas-usa.com/

China Automotive Systems, Inc. is one of the largest power steering components and systems supplier in China. It is also a holding company that, through Genesis, manufactures power steering systems and other components for automobiles. Founded in 1993, all operations are conducted through eight Sino-foreign joint ventures in China and a wholly owned subsidiary in the United States. The company has business relations with more than 60 vehicle manufacturers, including FAW Group and Dongfeng Group; Shenyang Brilliance Jinbei, light vehicle manufacturer in China; Chery Automobile, state-owned car manufacturer in China, and Xi'an BYD Automobile and Zhejiang Geely car manufacturers.

The company currently offers four separate series of power steering with an annual production capacity of over 3.5 million sets, steering columns, steering oil pumps and steering hoses.

In 2010, CAAS was selected among more than 700 contestants as one of only six suppliers honored as Chery's "2010 Annual Best Parts Supplier".

China Automotive Systems is listed under the International Directory of Company Histories, Volume 87.

== Research ==
China Automotive has partnered with Tsinghua University to establish a steering system research center called Tsinghua Henglong Automobile Steering Research Institute, for the purpose of developing and testing electronic-controlled power steering systems.

== Acquisitions and growth ==
At the end of 2008, China Automotive Systems acquired an additional 36.5% of Henglong Automotive Parts Company on top of the already owned 44.5%. Henglong is engaged in manufacturing power steering systems and components for China's rapidly growing passenger vehicle market. CAAS now holds an 80% equity interest in Henglong.

Following China's entry into WTO, its auto demand experienced phenomenal growth. For the year ended December 31, 2010, net sales rose 35.3% to $345.9 million from $255.6 million for 2009. Gross profit increased by 31.8% to $80.3 million from $60.9 million in 2009. Gross margin was 23% in both 2010 and 2009. Income from operations grew 58.1% to $54.0 million compared with $34.2 million in 2009. The operating margin increased to 15.6% in 2010 from 13.4% in 2009.
