= G share =

G shares (Chinese: G股) refers to shares traded in the stock exchanges of mainland China that belong to companies that have accomplished stock right division reforms, and have regained business on the market. Owing to the provisional designation of the letter "G" for such stocks during testing of a proposed bill, the category of industries were referred to as the "G board", and the shares as "G shares".

== See also ==
- Chip
- A share
- B share
- H share
- Red chip
- P chip
- S chip
- N share
- L share
