= H share =

Chinese company stocks traded on the Hong Kong stock exchange

H shares (Chinese: H股) refer to the shares of companies incorporated in mainland China that are traded on the Hong Kong Stock Exchange. Many companies float their shares simultaneously on the Hong Kong market and one of the two mainland Chinese stock exchanges in Shanghai or Shenzhen, they are known as A+H companies.

H shares are also held by a nominee service company "HKSCC Nominees Limited" (HKSCC for Hong Kong Securities Clearing Company), which was owned by Hong Kong Exchanges and Clearing.

Price discrepancies between the H shares and the A share counterparts of the same company are not uncommon. A shares generally trade at a premium to H shares as the People's Republic of China government restricts mainland Chinese people from investing abroad and foreigners from investing in the A-share markets in mainland China.

Tsingtao Brewery was the first enterprise to offer H-shares when it became the first Chinese firm listed on the Hong Kong Stock Exchange in June 1993.

== Index for H shares ==
The index for H shares was called Hang Seng China Enterprises Index.

== See also ==
- Chip
- A share
- B share
- Red chip companies incorporated outside mainland China but main business was related to mainland China, and listed in Hong Kong Stock Exchange
- P chip
- S chip
- N share
- L share
- G share
- China Concepts Stock
