= A-share (mainland China) =

Shares in domestic currency on mainland China stock exchanges

A-shares (Chinese: A股), also known as domestic shares (Chinese: 内资股), are shares that are denominated in renminbi and traded in the Shanghai and Shenzhen stock exchanges, as well as the National Equities Exchange and Quotations. The National Equities Exchange and Quotations is an over-the-counter market launched in 2012. In November 2021 a more specialized successor, the Beijing Stock Exchange, opened with 81 listed companies, 71 of which moved over from it.

These are in contrast to B-shares that are denominated in foreign currency and traded in Shanghai and Shenzhen, as well as H shares, that are denominated in Hong Kong dollars and traded in the Stock Exchange of Hong Kong.

A-shares are generally owned by domestic investors. As of 2023, foreign investors own only 3-5% of China's A-shares equity and bond market.

In 2018 MSCI began including Chinese A-shares in its MSCI Emerging Markets Index.

== See also ==
- Chip
- Red chip
- P chip
- S chip
- N share
- L share
- G share
- China Concepts Stock
