= ChinaCast Education =

Chinese educational services company

ChinaCast Education Corporation is a Hong Kong–based for-profit, post-secondary education and e-learning services provider in the People's Republic of China. Established in 1999, the Company provides its post-secondary degree programs through its 80% ownership in the holding company of the Foreign Trade and Business College (FTBC) of Chongqing Normal University. The company provides its e-learning services to post-secondary institutions, K-12 schools, government agencies and corporate enterprises via its nationwide satellite broadband network. It listed on the NASDAQ in 2007 but was delisted in 2012 amidst board turmoil and allegations of wrongdoing.

== History ==
The company was founded in 1999 by Ron Chan Tze Ngon as ChinaCast Communications Limited, and subsequently raised a Series A venture capital round which included investors Hughes Network Systems and Intel Capital.

In May 2004, the company was renamed ChinaCast Communications Holdings Limited (CCH) and made an initial public offering on the Singapore Stock Exchange. In 2006, a US-listed Special Purpose Acquisition Company, Great Wall Acquisition Corporation, acquired 100% of the company in a reverse merger transaction and the Singapore company was delisted, Great Wall Acquisition Corporation was then renamed ChinaCast Education Corporation in early 2007 and then listed on the NASDAQ Global Market Exchange in 2007.

In April 2008, the Company completed the acquisition of 80% of the holding company of the Foreign Trade and Business College of Chongqing Normal University. Based in Hong Kong, all of the company's assets are in mainland China, and it is organised under Delaware law.

As of early 2011 the company had a market value of US$285 million. ChinaCast owned three physical education centres in addition to its e-learning platforms.

=== Legal issues and delisting ===
Problems for the company began in late 2011. By May 2012, ChinaCast was delisted.

In December 2011, ChinaCast's board of directors accused Ned Sherwood, one of the directors and a company shareholder, of insider trading. Sherwood said the board was using the allegations to remove him because he disagreed with them about a possible sale of the company. Sherwood filed a complaint in a Delaware court, and attempted to get three directors, himself included, elected to the board. The election was supervised by IVS Associates, and accountants firm, and left Sherwood in control of the board. Chairman Chan Tze Gong was terminated.

Around the same time, short-seller Sahm Adrangi of Kerrisdale Capital Management LLC accused ChinaCast of falsifying its financial records to inflate its value, attract investors, and deceive the Chinese government. Adrangi stated that he had found one of the company's physical locations, an education centre for 1,200 students, "practically empty".

In 2012, ChinaCast's founder and CEO, Ron Chan Tze Ngon, was accused of having siphoned US$120 million of the company's funds starting in 2008, and trying to interfere with ChinaCast's annual audit. Chan was further accused of being involved with Harmony, a rival Meyers' provider, and was removed as the company's CEO in the same year. He and others faced a lawsuit over the theft in 2014, with the total sum of stolen money reported as US$150 million. In 2013, the U.S. Securities and Exchange Commission won a case against Chan in which they accused him of "systematically looting the company", and was awarded US$49 million in the Manhattan federal court. In 2015, the 9th Circuit ruled that the company can be held liable for the actions of its CEO, overruling an earlier judgement by a Pasadena court and allowing the litigation to continue.

ChinaCast filed for bankruptcy in 2016, in part to seek protection from a $65.8m judgment secured against it by investors, and in part to pursue its own embezzlement case against Chan.
