= Shuanghuan SCEO =

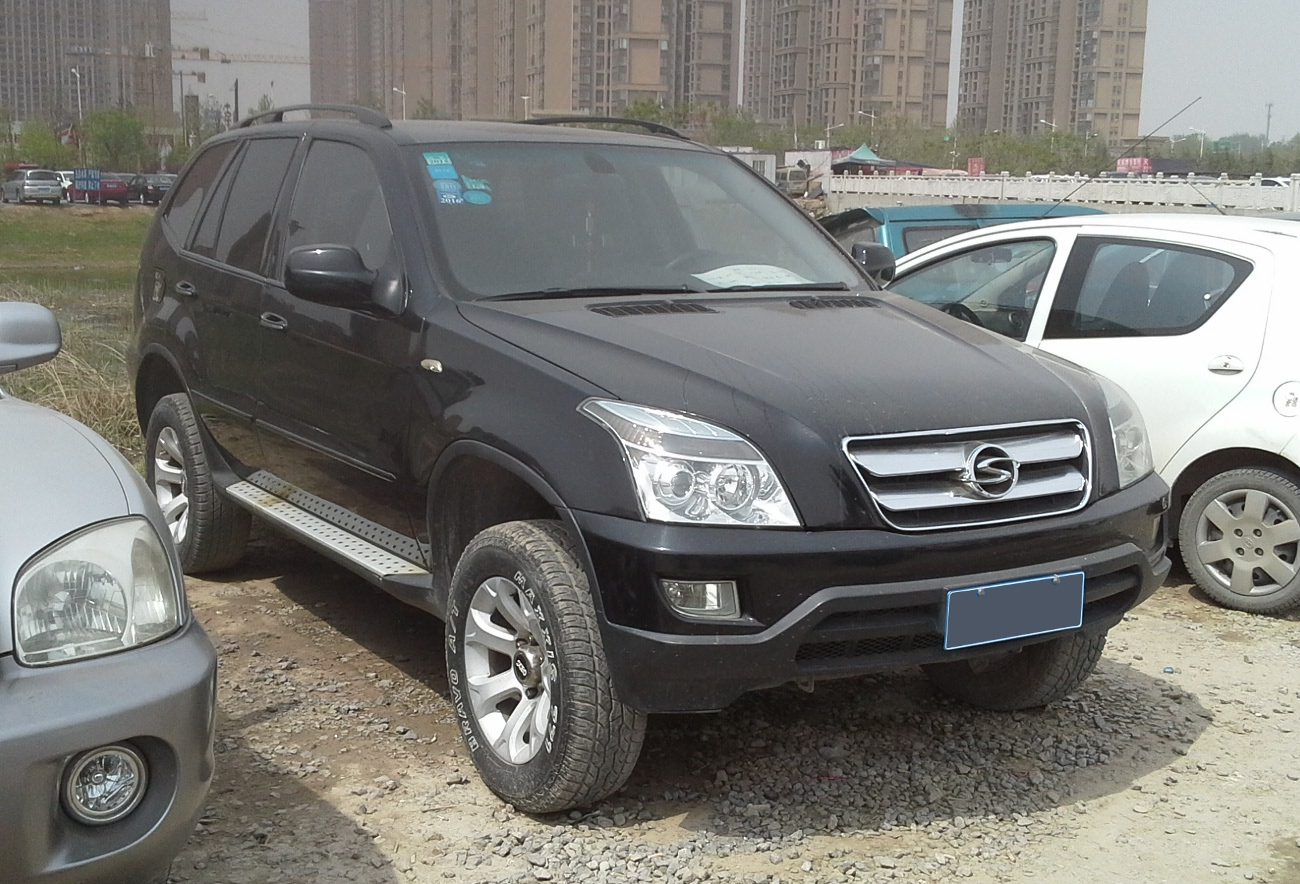

Overview
- Manufacturer: Shijiazhuang Shuanghuan Automobile Co
- Also called: Shuanghuan CEO; Martin Motors CEO (European Union)
- Production: 2005–2011
- Model years: 2005–2011
- Assembly: China

Body and chassis
- Class: Mid-size crossover SUV
- Body style: 5-door SUV

Powertrain
- Engine: 2.0 L 4G63 I4 (petrol); 2.4 L 4G64 I4 (petrol); 2.4 L 4G69 I4 (petrol); 2.5 L YC4FB100-30 I4 (turbo diesel)
- Transmission: 5 speed manual 4 speed automatic

Dimensions
- Wheelbase: 112.2 in (2.85 m)
- Length: 185.4 in (4.71 m)
- Width: 73.6 in (1.87 m)
- Height: 71.7 in (1.82 m)
- Curb weight: 4,000 lb (1,800 kg)

The Shuanghuan SCEO (Chinese: 双环SCEO) is an off-road vehicle manufactured by the Chinese auto maker Shuanghuan Auto based in Shijiazhuang, Hebei.

The company has copied the looks of the Toyota Land Cruiser Prado inside and at the front end, the BMW X5 (E53) at the rear end, and the BMW X3 at the sides.

The Shuanghuan SCEO's codename is known as the HBJ6474Y.

== History ==
The SCEO was launched in China in 2005, which was sold at 123,800-159,800 yuan.

The SCEO was exported to more than 30 countries, according to a company report in 2006.

=== BMW copy claim ===
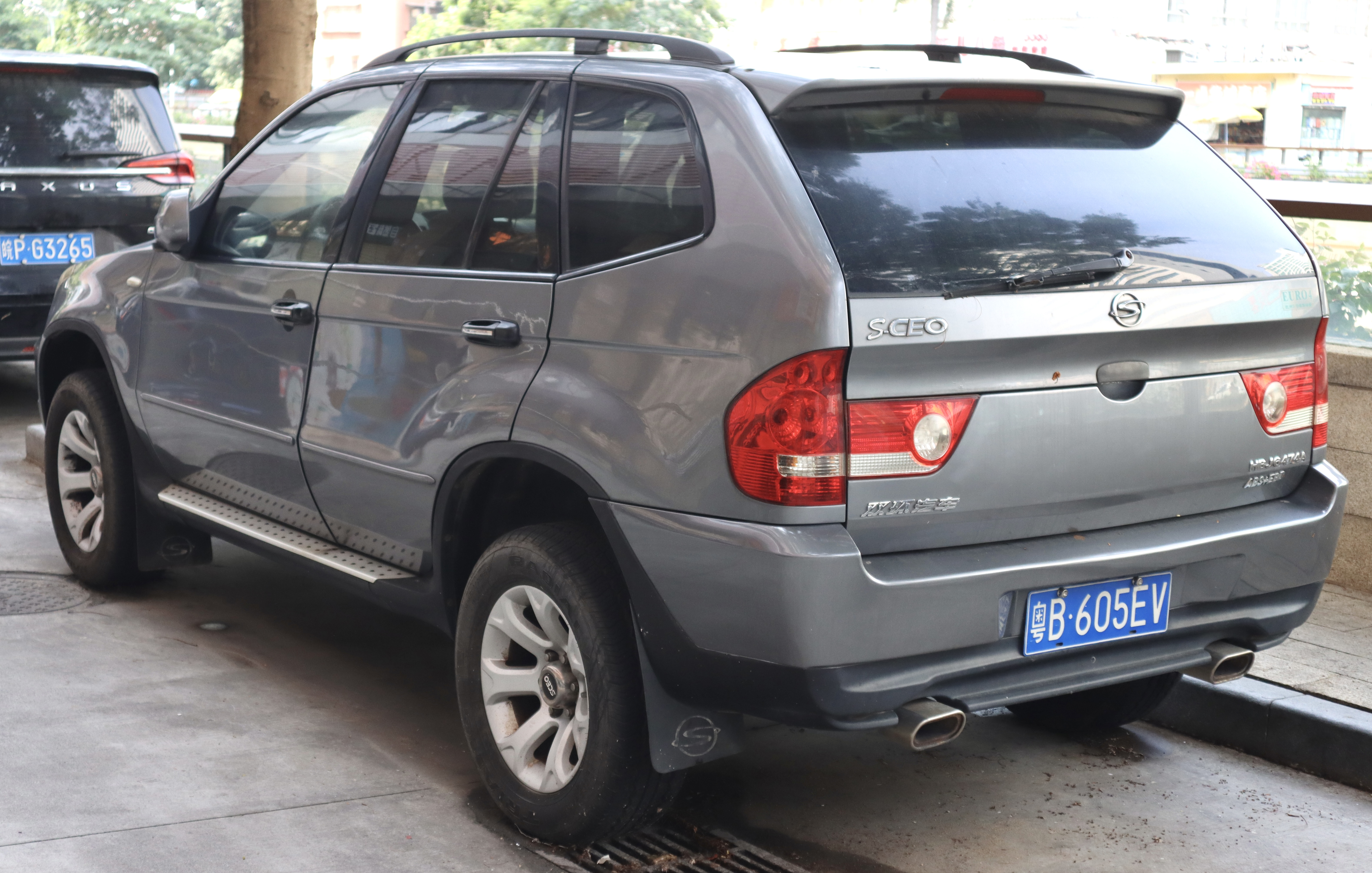
The rear of the Shuanghuan SCEO, which BMW alleged is a blatant copy of its X5 model

The SCEO's design was the cause of many disputes when the company wanted to show it at the Frankfurt Motor Show in 2007.

In June 2008, the Regional Court of Munich ruled that the Chinese SUV brand, "Shuang-huan SCEO" is a copy of the BMW X5, prohibited the defendant importer of these vehicles in the "trade in Germany" offer and ordered the destruction of all "vehicles with a certain look" at which the defendant's possession or ownership (Az.: 4HK O 16807/07).

Following a court case in Germany brought by BMW, the car was banned from sale in Germany. It was sold in Italy and central Europe, following BMW losing its court case in Italy.

== Specification ==
The SCEO is powered by a choice of two 4-cylinder gasoline engines and a diesel option: a 2.0-litre producing 82 kW (111 PS; 110 bhp) and a 2.4-litre producing 100 kW (136 PS; 134 bhp). A 2.5-litre diesel option provides 75 kW (102 PS; 101 bhp). The engines are sourced from Shenyang Aerospace Mitsubishi Motors Engine Manufacturing Corporation.

The SCEO was available with either a 5 speed manual alongside an optional 4 speed automatic transmission.
