= TechFaith =

China TechFaith Wireless Communication Technology Limited or TechFaith Wireless (Nasdaq: CNTF), founded in July 2002, is one of the biggest handset solution providers in China. It employs around 1300 engineers. It has been listed in Nasdaq since 2005. Their revenues were 80.8 million US dollars in 2006 and 143.3 million US dollars in 2007.

In their annual report for 2007 they say that they are planning an Android based mobile phone. They are typically an ODM that make Windows Mobile handsets.
