= S chip =

Chinese companies listed on the Singapore Exchange

S chips (Chinese: S股) are Chinese companies listed on the Singapore Exchange. Their shares are known as S shares. S chips are incorporated in Singapore, the British Virgin Islands, the Cayman Islands and Bermuda and have their business operations in mainland China.

Some S chips were beset by corporate governance and accounting problems, resulting in reputational issues that led to share price declines in 2009. The main difference between S chips and P chips is the exchange on which they are traded.

An index that covers the prices of S-Chips is the FTSE ST China Index. From January 2008 to October 2009, the FTSE ST China Index had a return of −60%, as opposed to a return of −20% for the Hang Seng China Enterprises Index, which covers the prices of H shares.

== See also ==
- Chip
- A share
- B share
- Red chip
- P chip
- Blue chip
- N share
- L share
- G share
- China Concepts Stock
- Green chip
