= China Sunergy =

Chinese solar cell manufacturer

China Sunergy Co., Ltd.
- Native name: 中电光伏
- Industry: Semiconductors & Related Devices
- Founded: August 4, 2006
- Headquarters: Nanjing, Jiangsu, China
- Key people: Tingxiu Lu (CEO)
- Products: Solar cells and solar modules (PV modules)
- Number of employees: 1,607
- Website: China Sunergy website (CN); China Sunergy website (EN)

China Sunergy CSUN (Chinese: 中电光伏) is a Chinese solar cell products manufacturer based in Nanjing, Jiangsu. The company specializes in creating solar cells from silicon wafers. China Sunergy has a major customer base in China, but also sells their products internationally. On May 17, 2007, the company began producing both monocrystalline and multicrystalline silicon solar cells. In 2012 the annual production of the cells were 1 GW and PV modules 1.2 GW. After listing as a NASDAQ Company in 2007, on May 23, 2013, China Sunergy opened its first international manufacturing base in Turkey. Turkey factory has the biggest solar cell and module capacity among both in Turkey and Europe. CSUN currently is the only Chinese solar cells and module manufacturer with a manufacturing base in Europe. Located in Tuzla Free Trade Zone, Istanbul, CSUN (Turkey) is in progress of building its second factory in Turkey within 2015. CSUN has been recognized as a Tier 1 module supplier by the Bloomberg New Energy Finance (BENF) PV Module Maker Tiering System on 23 March 2014.

Their distribution network for solar panels covers over 79 distributors and wholesalers, across over 26 different countries.
