= Shuanghuan Noble =

Chinese car made 2004–2016

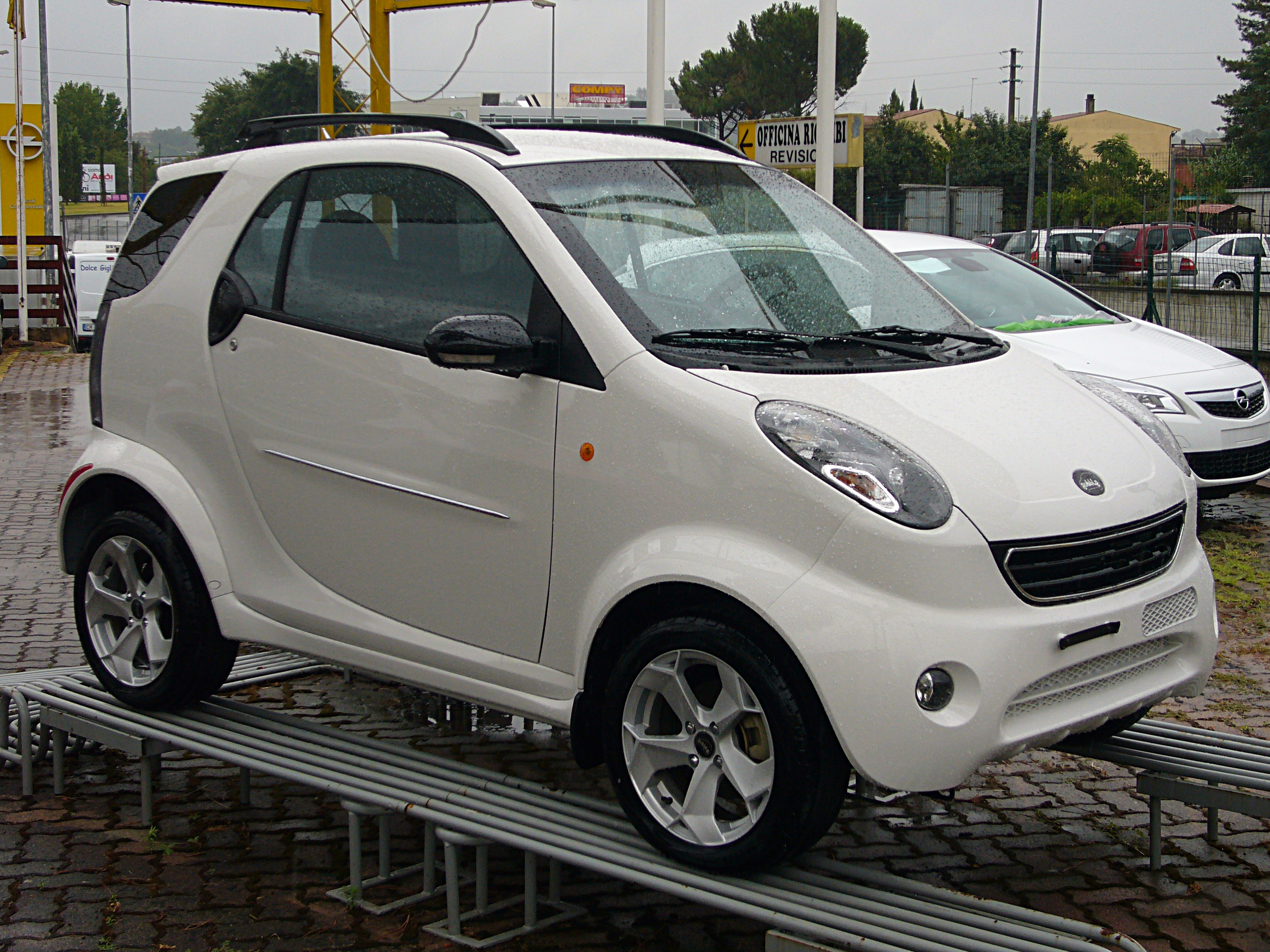

Overview
- Manufacturer: Shuanghuan Auto
- Also called: Shuanghuan Bubble; Martin Motors Noble; Martin Motors Bubble; Hongxing X1
- Production: 2004–2016
- Assembly: Shijiazhuang, Hebei, China

Body and chassis
- Class: Microcar
- Body style: 3-door hatchback
- Layout: Front-engine, front-wheel-drive
- Related: Wheego Whip; Wheego LiFe

Powertrain
- Engine: 0.8 L SQR372 I3 (petrol); 1.0 L DA465Q-2 I4; 1.1 L DA468QA I4
- Transmission: 5 speed manual

Dimensions
- Wheelbase: 2.025 mm
- Length: 3.010 mm
- Width: 1.605 mm
- Height: 1.600 mm
- Curb weight: 875 kg

The Shuanghuan Noble (also sold as the Shuanghuan Bubble, the Martin Motors Noble and the Martin Motors Bubble) is a 4-seater hatchback that was produced by Chinese carmaker Shuanghuan Auto. It was sold in various European and Asian countries and has generated large controversies due to its similar styling to that of the Smart Fortwo.

== Body ==
The Noble uses a unibody frame based on a shortened Suzuki Alto platform. It carries the same MacPherson strut independent front suspension and a dead axle rear suspension with a Panhard stabilizing rod. The body is constructed using high tensile and ultra high tensile steel, a choice that makes the car somewhat heavy for its size at 875 kg.

=== Seating ===
The Noble has a seating capacity of four passengers. The rear seats provide enough room for two adults with plenty of space for their knees, although the low roof-line restricts headroom significantly. The rear seats can fold down to reveal a flat loading space, which otherwise is negligible. A full size spare wheel is housed under the rear seats.

=== Trim ===
Standard trim includes dual front airbags, ABS braking system with EBD, audio system with radio and USB slot with MP3 playback capability, electric power steering, power windows, and air conditioning.

== Engine and transmission ==
The Noble is a front-wheel-drive car with the engine housed under the front bonnet. The engine itself is a 1.1 liter 16v DOHC version of the Suzuki Wagon-R engine with a power output rated at 68 PS (50 kW; 67 hp) at 6.000 rpm and 88 N⋅m (65 lb⋅ft) of torque at 4500 rpm. With the 5-speed manual transmission the Noble sprints from 0–100 km/h in 17.1s and reaches a top speed of 138 km/h. The engine is reported to be quite frugal using only 4.5 L/100 km. A five speed manual gearbox is offered in both standard and automated versions.

== Electric version ==
The Noble was being sold as an electric car in some U.S. states, built by Wheego Technologies from body shells shipped to the USA from China. The Wheego Whip as it is named in the U.S. is able to reach speeds up to 70 miles per hour (113 km/h), later sold as the Wheego LiFe, but will be initially sold as a low-speed vehicle with a maximum speed of 25 miles per hour (40 km/h) until it passes crash tests by the US DoT.

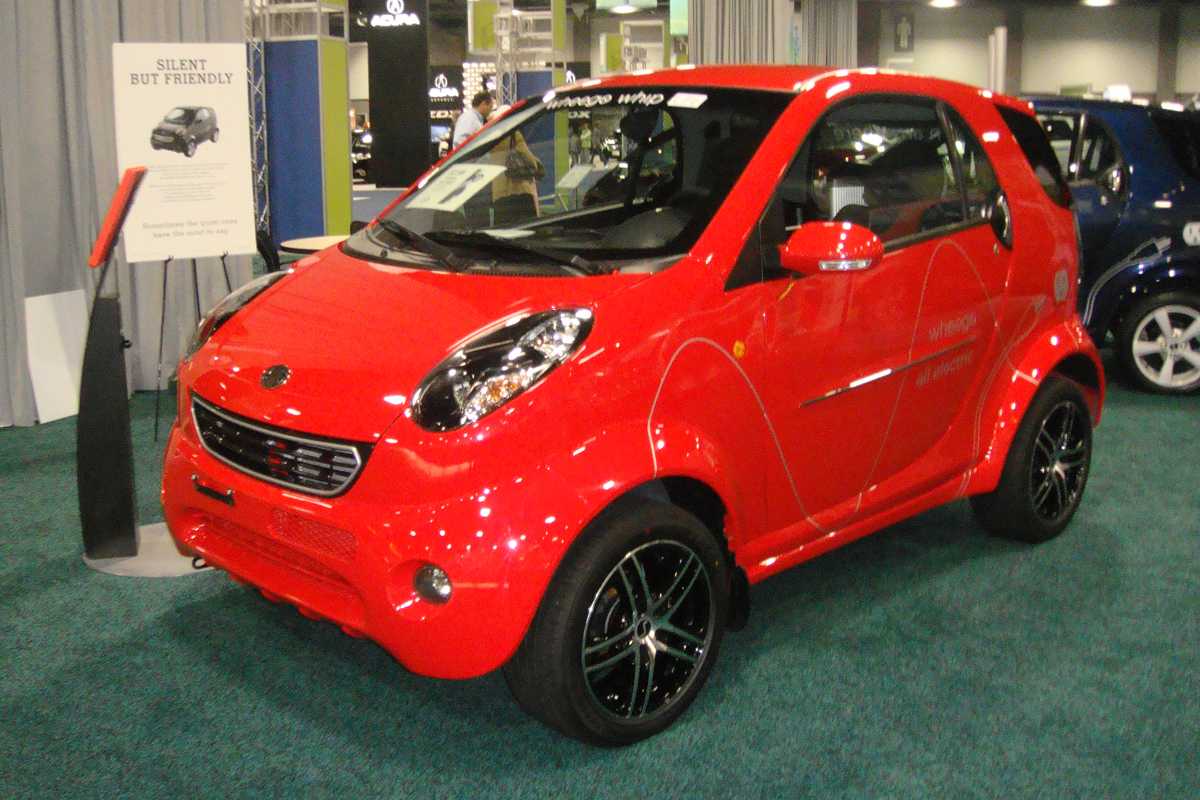
Wheego Whip at the 2010 Washington Auto Show

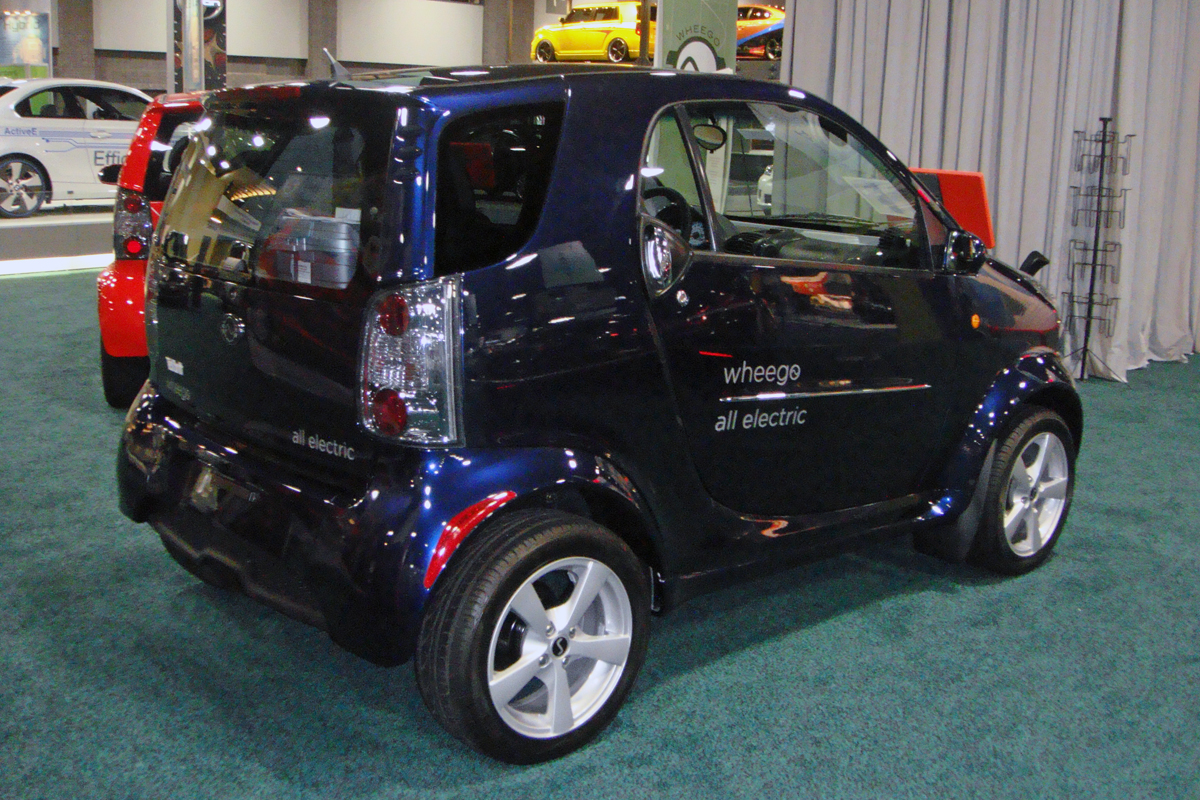
Wheego LiFe at the 2010 Washington Auto Show

== Controversies ==
The car has caused numerous controversies, with Mercedes-Benz even filing a lawsuit against Shuanghuan Auto because of the similarities with the Smart Fortwo. Mercedes-Benz also persuaded the Italian court to prohibit Martin Motors from exhibiting the Noble, called the Bubble, at the Bologna Motor Show, but this was violated and the car was put on display. Martin demonstrated the Bubble outside the show. "We want everyone to see in real life how a four-seat front-engine front-wheel drive minicar differs from a rear-engine rear-wheel drive two-seater," said Martin Motors spokesperson Viviana Martinelli.

In May 2009 a Greek judge ruled against Daimler and cleared the car allowing sales to begin in Greece. The judge answering to Daimler's demand to ban the Chinese vehicle from entering the Greek market said that "The impression the Noble makes on a third and informed party by its visual appearance is different to the one that is made to the same person by the Smart... It is commonly accepted that the decision over buying a new car cannot be based only on the exterior characteristics but many other technical specifications such as the power of the engine, fuel consumption, trim specification, retail price and dealers' network."

The ruling states that the latter party's doings "cannot possibly misguide the public" as the German company claimed in its legal request. The judge noted the salient fact that "the plaintiff is no longer selling the specific generation of the Smart which claims to have been copied, but a different vehicle, with much different characteristics."

The judge also accepted in whole the defendant's argument that cars of the same segment cannot avoid a certain level of resemblance due to technical restrictions, similar purposes and goals, especially when it comes to such small cars that present a challenge to design. The ruling concludes that "there is no competition between the two companies."
