= Medium-speed vehicle =

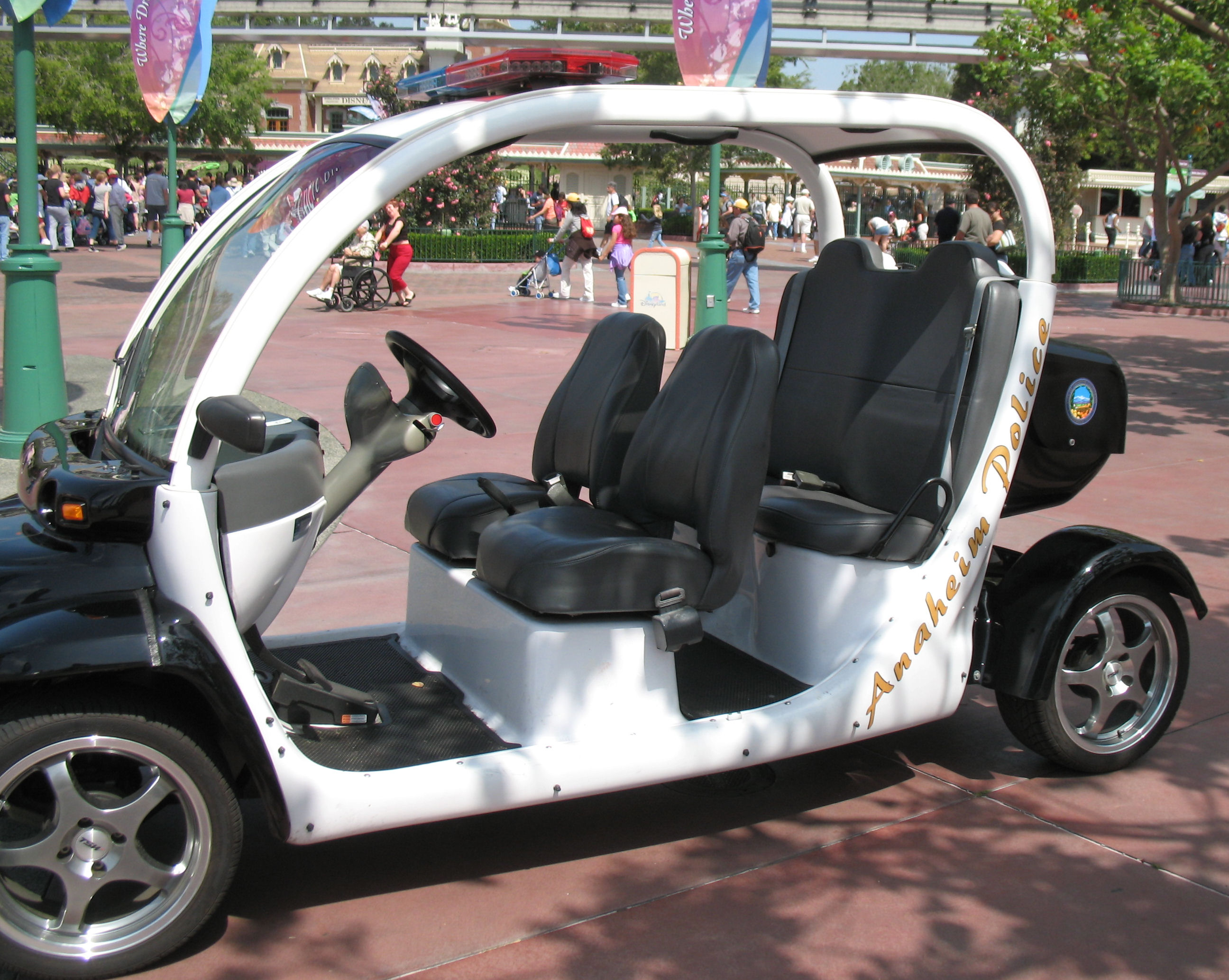
Anaheim Police GEM vehicle

Medium-speed vehicle (MSV) is a vehicle registration category in some states of the United States where applicable vehicles are allowed to travel on roads at speeds up to 35–45 mph (56–72 km/h). The safety regulations for MSVs are more stringent than those for Low-speed vehicles.

The U.S. State of Montana's SB0185 was the first law to define this class of vehicle. Minnesota The State of Washington has laws that allow for vehicles that travel up to 35 mph (56 km/h), Tennessee's laws allow for vehicles that travel up to 40 mph (64 km/h), and Colorado, Kentucky, Montana, Oklahoma, Oregon, and Texas all have laws allowing MSVs that travel up to 45 mph (72 km/h). Maryland's law considers the speed capability of the particular vehicle.

== See also ==
- Neighborhood Electric Vehicle
- Side-by-side (vehicle)
