= China Yuchai International =

Holding company

China Yuchai International Limited
- Type: Public
- Traded as: NYSE: CYD
- Industry: Diversified Machinery
- Founded: 1993
- Headquarters: Singapore
- Key people: Weng Ming Hoh (President) (2012.12)
- Products: Diesel and Natural gas engines
- Website: www.cyilimited.com

China Yuchai International Limited, a holding company listed in NYSE, was established in 1993, and is currently headquartered in Singapore. The firm has two components: Guangxi Yuchai Machinery Company Limited ("GYMCL"), which engages in engine manufacturing, and HL Global Enterprises Limited ("HLGE"), which operates in the hospitality industry. The firm also owns a 12.2% interest in Thakral Corporation Ltd ("TCL") (2012.4), a distributor of consumer electronic products and investor in property and equity.

== Products ==
The GYMCL division produces engines for highway vehicles, generator sets, and marine and industrial applications. It also offers diesel-related products, such as power generators and other engines. Its products include the YC6K diesel engine, high-horsepower marine diesel engines (YC6T, YC6C, YC12VT, YC8C, 4D20), power generation engines, and the 4D20 4-cylinder passenger car engine.

The HLGE division operates hotels and other properties in China and Malaysia.

The TCL group markets digital cameras, data projectors, iPhones, iPads and audio products, plasma and light-emitting diode (LED) televisions, desktop and notebook computers. The division also has its own brand: YES brand.

== Operations ==
=== Executive leadership ===
Weng Ming Hoh is the current president and the Director of the company.

=== Recent developments ===
- 2013.9, the company's product YC6K 6 cylinder 12L series of engines won the European Union's ("EU") E-mark certification.
- 2013.6, China Yuchai International Limited announced its subsidiary "GYMCL", Y&C Engine Co., Ltd. Baotou Bei Ben Heavy Duty Truck Co., Ltd. and Inner Mongolia First Machinery Group Co., Ltd. formed a new joint venture company (“JV Company”) in Baotou, Inner Mongolia. In October 2013, China Yuchai International Limited announced changes in the ownership structure of the joint venture.

== Guangxi Yuchai New Energy Vehicle Co., Ltd. ==
Guangxi Yuchai New Energy Vehicle Co., Ltd. (Yuchai New Energy Vehicle) was founded in 2017, and currently produces the EC electric light truck series.

Yuchai EC series

== Guangxi Yuchai Machinery Company Limited ==
The Guangxi Yuchai Machinery Co. Ltd was Established in 1951 as a manufacturer of Automobile, Marine and Stationary Diesel Engines such as Trucks, Buses, Passenger Vehicles, Construction Equipment, Marine and Agricultural Applications. Their Headquarters is located at Yulin, Guangxi Province, China, and it has seven production bases such as Fujian, Jiangsu, Anhui and Shandong etc.

In 2012, amid continuous market slump, Yuchai registered an excessive sale volume of 11,000 units.

=== Engines ===
Truck Engines

YC4D - 4.2 litre Turbocharged and Intercooled inline-four cylinder, four stroke cycle, water cooled cycle diesel engine rated from 120–130 hp (89–97 kW)

YC4E - 4.2 litre Turbocharged and Intercooled inline-four cylinder, four-stroke cycle, water cooled diesel engine with either injection pump or Bosch Electronically Controlled high pressure Common rail system rated from 140–160 hp (100–120 kW).

YC4FA - 2.9 litre Turbocharged and Intercooled inline-four cylinder, four-stroke cycle, water cooled, diesel engine with Bosch Electronically Controlled high pressure Common rail System rated from 90–120 hp (67–89 kW)

YC6A - 7.2 litre Turbocharged and Intercooled inline-six cylinder four-stroke cycle, water cooled, diesel engine with either Injection pump or Bosch Electronically Controlled high pressure Common rail System and SCR Post-Processing rated from 240–270 hp (180–200 kW)

YC6J - 6.4 litre Turbocharged and Intercooled inline-six cylinder, four-stroke cycle, water cooled, diesel engine both available with Bosch Injection pump for Euro 2 or Electronically Controlled high pressure Common rail System and SCR Post-Processing for Euro 3 to 5 it's rated from 190–230 hp (140–170 kW)

YC6L - 8.4 litre Turbocharged and Intercooled inline-six cylinder, four-stroke cycle, water cooled, diesel engine with Bosch Electronically Controlled high pressure Common rail System for and SCR Post-Processing from Euro 3 to 5, it's rated from 260–330 hp (190–250 kW)

YC6M/MK - 9.8 to 10.3 litre Turbocharged and Intercooled inline-six cylinder, four-stroke cycle, water cooled, diesel engine with Bosch Electronically Controlled high pressure Common rail System and SCR Post-Processing rated from 280–385 hp (209–287 kW)

Bus Engines

YC4D - 4.2 litre Turbocharged and Intercooled, inline four cylinder, four-stroke cycle, water cooled, diesel engine rated from 130–140 hp (97–104 kW)

YC4E - 4.2 litre Turbocharged and Intercooled inline-four cylinder, four-stroke cycle, water cooled, diesel engine with Bosch Electronically Controlled high pressure Common rail System and SCR Post-Processing rated from 140–160 hp (100–120 kW)

YC4F - 2.9 litre Turbocharged and Intercooled inline-four cylinder, four-stroke cycle, water cooled, diesel engine rated from 90–115 hp (67–86 kW)

YC4FA - 2.9 litre Turbocharged and Intercooled inline-four cylinder four-stroke cycle, water cooled, diesel engine with Bosch Electronically Controlled high pressure Common rail System rated from 90–130 hp (67–97 kW)

YC4G - 5.9 litre Turbocharged and Intercooled inline-four cylinder four-stroke cycle, water cooled, diesel engine with Bosch Electronically Controlled high pressure Common rail System and SCR Post-Processing rated from 170–220 hp (130–160 kW)

YC6A - 7.2 litre Turbocharged and Intercooled inline-six cylinder, four-stroke cycle, water cooled, diesel engine with Bosch injection pump for Euro 2 or Electronically Controlled high pressure Common rail System and SCR Post-Processing for Euro 3 to 5, it's rated from 240–280 hp (180–210 kW)

YC6G - 7.8 litre Turbocharged and Intercooled inline-six cylinder, four-stroke, water cooled, diesel engine with Bosch P7100 injection pump for Euro 2 or Electronically Controlled high pressure Common rail System and SCR Post Processing for Euro 3 to 5, it's rated from 200–300 hp (150–220 kW)

YC6J - 6.4 litre Turbocharged and Intercooled inline-six cylinder, four-stroke cycle, water cooled, diesel engine with either Bosch injection pump for Euro 2 or Electronically Controlled high pressure Common rail System and SCR Post-Processing for Euro 3 to 5, it's rated from 190–245 hp (142–183 kW)

YC6L - 8.4 litre Turbocharged and Intercooled inline-six cylinder, four-stroke cycle, water cooled, diesel engine with Bosch P7100 injection pump for Euro 2 or Electronically Controlled high pressure Common rail System and SCR Post-Processing for Euro 3 to 5, it's rated from 240–330 hp (180–250 kW)

YC6MK - 10.3 litre Turbocharged and Intercooled inline-six cylinder, four-stroke cycle, water cooled, diesel engine with Bosch Electronically Controlled high pressure Common rail System and SCR Post-Processing rated from 340–400 hp (250–300 kW)

Agricultural Engines

YC4A - 4.8 litre Turbocharged and Intercooled inline-four cylinder, four-stroke cycle, water cooled, diesel engine with Tier 2 Emission Compliant rated from 80–130 hp (60–97 kW)

YC4B - 4.5 litre Turbocharged and Intercooled inline-four cylinder, four-stroke cycle, water cooled, diesel engine with Tier 2 Emission Compliant rated from 85–115 hp (63–86 kW)

YC4D - 4.2 litre Turbocharged and Intercooled inline-four cylinder, four-stroke cycle, water cooled, diesel engine with Tier 2 Emission Compliant rated from 90–120 hp (67–89 kW)

YC4F - 2.6 litre Turbocharged and Intercooled inline-four cylinder four-stroke cycle, water cooled, diesel engine with Tier 2 Emission Compliant rated only 65 hp (48 kW)

YC6A - 7.2 litre Turbocharged and Intercooled inline-six cylinder, four-stroke cycle, water cooled, diesel engine with Tier 2 Emission Compliant rated from 205–230 hp (153–172 kW)

YC6B - 6.8 litre Turbocharged and Intercooled inline-six cylinder, four-stroke cycle, water cooled, diesel engine with Tier 2 Emission Compliant rated from 135–170 hp (101–127 kW)

YC6J - 6.4 litre Turbocharged and Intercooled inline-six cylinder, four-stroke cycle, water cooled, diesel engine with Tier 2 Emission Compliant rated from 175–185 hp (130–138 kW)

=== Construction Machinery Engines ===
Loader Engines

YC4D - 4.2 litre Naturally Asipirated, inline-four cylinder four stroke cycle, water cooled, diesel engine with Tier 2 Emission Compliant rated only 80 hp (60 kW)

YC4B - 4.5 litre Naturally Aspirated inline-four cylinder, four-stroke cycle, water cooled, diesel engine with Tier 2 Emission Compliant rated only 90 hp (67 kW)

YC4A - 4.8 litre Turbocharged and Intercooled inline-four cylinder, four-stroke cycle, water cooled, diesel engine with Tier 2 Emission Compliant rated only 105 hp (78 kW)

YC6J - 6.4 litre Turbocharged and Intercooled inline-six cylinder, four-stroke cycle, water cooled, diesel engine with Tier 2 Emission Compliant rated only 125 hp (93 kW)

YC6B - 6.8 litre Turbocharged and Intercooled inline-six cylinder, four stroke cycle, water cooled, diesel engine with Tier 2 Emission Compliant rated only 125 hp (93 kW)

YC6MK - 9.8 litre Turbocharged and Imtercooled inline-six cylinder four stroke cycle, water cooled, diesel engine with Tier 2 Emission Compliant rated only 220 hp (160 kW)

Forklift Engines

YC4A - 4.8 litre Turbocharged inline-four cylinder diesel engine with Tier 2 Emission Compliant rated only 115 hp (86 kW)

YC6B - 6.8 litre Naturally Aspirated inline-six cylinder diesel engine with Tier 2 Emission Compliant rated only 120 hp (89 kW)

YC6A - 7.2 litre Turbocharged inline-six cylinder diesel engine with Tier 2 Emission Compliant rated only 175 hp (130 kW)

Excavator Engines

YC4D - 4.2 litre Turbocharged inline-four cylinder diesel engine with Tier 2 Emission Compliant rated only 110 hp (82 kW)

YC6A - 6.4 litre Naturally Aspirated inline-six cylinder diesel engine with Tier 2 Emission Compliant rated only 160 hp (120 kW)

Road Roller Engines

YC6B/YC6A - 6.8-7.8 litre Naturally Aspirated/Turbocharged and Intercooled inline-six cylinder diesel engine with Tier 2 Emission Compliant rated from 120–190 hp (89–142 kW)

Drilling Rig Engines

YC4D - 4.2 litre Turbocharged inline-four cylinder diesel engine with Tier 2 Emission Compliant rated from 80–95 hp (60–71 kW)

YC6M - 9.8 litre Turbocharged inline-six cylinder diesel engine with Tier 2 Emission Compliant rated only 240 hp (180 kW)

Mining Truck Engines

YC6M - 10.3 litre Turbocharged inline-six cylinder diesel engine with Tier 2 Emission Compliant rated from 340–375 hp (254–280 kW)

=== Marine Engines ===
YC4F- 2.6 litre Turbocharged and Imtercooled Vertical inline-four cylinder four-stroke cycle water cooled diesel engine rated from 90–115 hp (67–86 kW)

YC4D - 4.2 litre Turbocharged and Intercooled Vertical inline-four cylinder four-stroke cycle water cooled diesel engine rated from 75–108 hp (56–81 kW)

YC6A - 7.2 litre Turbocharged and Intercooled Vertical inline-six cylinder four-stroke cycle water cooled diesel engine rated from 108–280 hp (81–209 kW)

YC6B/YC6J - 6.4-6.8 litre Naturally Aspirated/Turbocharged and Intercooled Vertical inline-six cylinder four-stroke cycle water cooled diesel engine rated from 100–165 hp (75–123 kW)

YC6CL/YC6C - 39.5-54.6 litre Turbocharged and Intercooled Vertical inline-six cylinder four-stroke cycle water cooled diesel engine rated from 480–1,200 hp (360–890 kW)

YC6T - 16.3 litre Turbocharged and Intercooled Vertical inline-six cylinder four-stroke cycle water cooled diesel engine rated from 300–540 hp (220–400 kW)

== Awards ==
- 2013.5: China Yuchai International Limited's subsidiary Guangxi Yuchai Machinery Company Limited won the "Gold Cup Award" and the "Annual Service Award" by Commercial Vehicle in China.
