= Blue chip (stock market) =

Stock in a corporation with a reputation for reliability and performance

A blue chip is capital stock of a joint-stock company with a national reputation for quality, reliability, and the ability to operate profitably in both good and bad times.

== Origin ==
As befits the sometimes high-risk nature of stock picking, the term "blue chip" derives from the card game poker. The simplest sets of poker chips include white, red, and blue chips, with American tradition dictating that the blues are highest in value.

In the United States, blue chips were traditionally used for higher values such that "blue chip" used in noun and adjectival senses are attested since 1873 and 1894, respectively. This established connotation was first extended to the sense of a blue-chip stock in 1892. According to Dow Jones company folklore, this sense extension was coined by Oliver Gingold (an early employee of the company that would become Dow Jones) sometime in the 1920s, when Gingold was standing by the stock ticker at the brokerage firm that later became Merrill Lynch. Noticing several trades at $200 or $250 a share or more, he said to Lucien Hooper of stock brokerage W.E. Hutton & Co. that he intended to return to the office to "write about these blue-chip stocks". It has been in use ever since, originally in reference to high-priced stocks, more commonly used today to refer to high-quality stocks.

== United States ==
The most popular index that follows United States blue chips is the Dow Jones Industrial Average, a price-weighted average of 30 blue-chip stocks that are generally the leaders in their industry. All companies in the Dow Jones Industrial Average are blue-chips, but the Dow Jones Industrial Average is an index that does not include all companies that are blue chips. Nevertheless, it has been a widely followed indicator of the stock market since October 1, 1928.

The S&P 100 is officially described as "[comprising] 100 major blue chip companies".

== See also ==
- Chip (stock market)
- Central European Blue Chip Index
- DAX
- EURO STOXX 50
- FTSE 100 Index
- SSE 50 Index
