= Shuanghuan Laiwang =

MPV and panel van

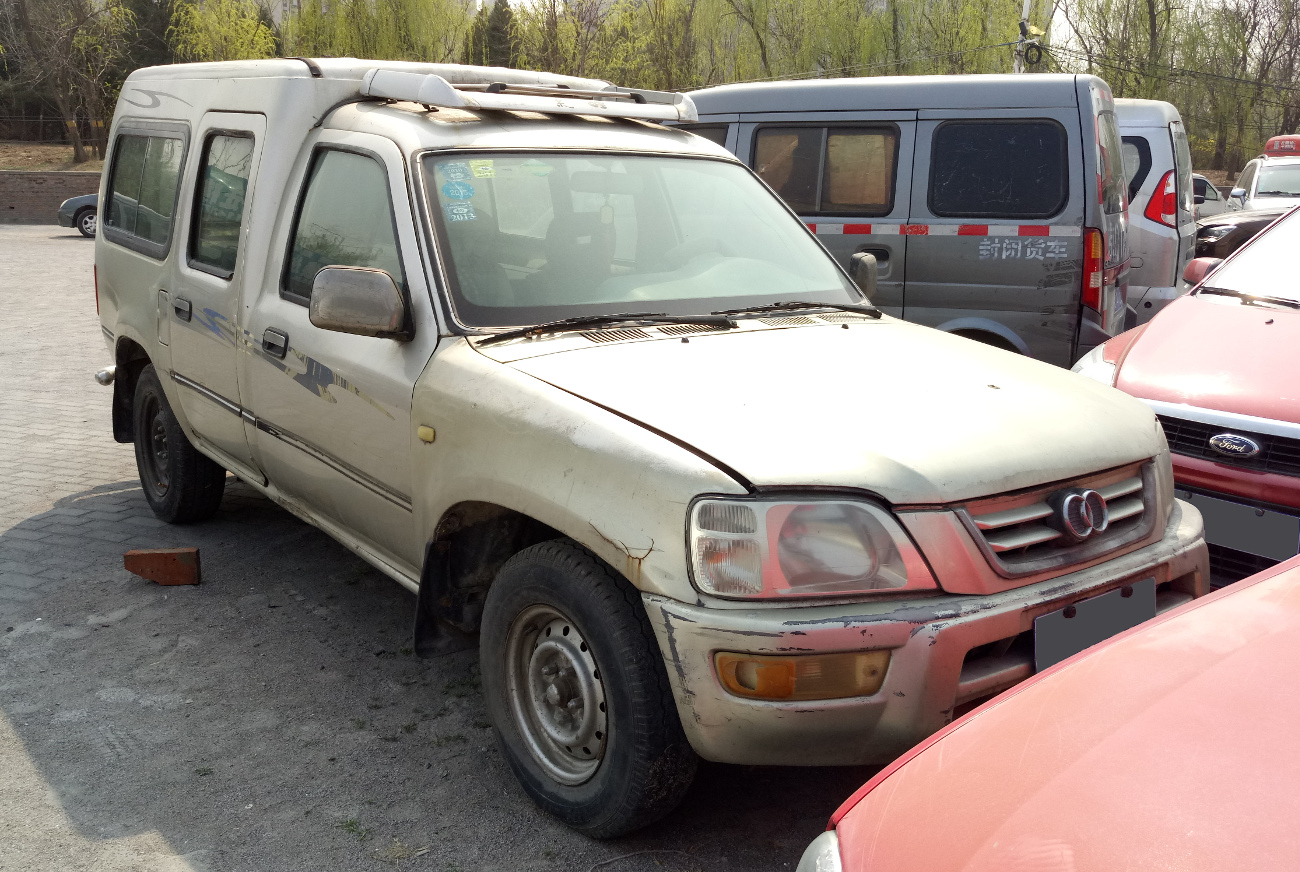

Overview
- Also called: Shuanghuan Laifu; Shuanghuan HBJ6460; Shuanghuan Jiaolian (until 2002)
- Production: 1998-2003
- Model years: 1998-2003
- Assembly: Shijiazhuang, Hebei, China

Body and chassis
- Class: Mid-size SUV
- Body style: 5-door SUV
- Layout: Front-engine, rear-wheel-drive

Powertrain
- Engine: 2.0L petrol I4; 2.2L petrol I4
- Transmission: 5-speed manual

Dimensions
- Wheelbase: 2,850 mm (112 in)
- Length: 4,600 mm (180 in)
- Width: 1,720 mm (68 in)
- Height: 1,810 mm (71 in)

Chronology
- Successor: Shuanghuan Laibao

The Shuanghuan Laifu (来福) or Shuanghuan Laiwang (来旺) (Formerly known as Shuanghuan Jiaolian until 2002) is a MPV and panel van of the Chinese automobile manufacturer Shuanghuan.

== Overview ==
Codenamed the HBJ6460, the van was originally called the Shuanghuan Jiaolian (later renamed to Laifu in 2002), with the front cab design heavily resembling a fifth generation 1992 Toyota Hilux. A facelift changed the model name to Shuanghuan Laiwang, with the front cab design heavily resembling a first generation Honda CR-V. The chassis of Shuanghuan Laiwang was designed based on the chassis of the fifth generation Toyota Hilux.

== Engine and transmission ==
The engine options of the Laibao Laiwang includes a 2.0 liter inline-four engine producing 109 hp (81 kW) and 165 N⋅m (122 lbf⋅ft) of torque, and a 2.2 liter inline-four engine producing 103 hp (77 kW) and 193 N⋅m (142 lbf⋅ft) of torque, with all engines mated to a 5-speed manual gearbox.

Prices before discontinuation of the Laibao Laiwang in 2003 ranges from 79,800 yuan to 93,800 yuan.

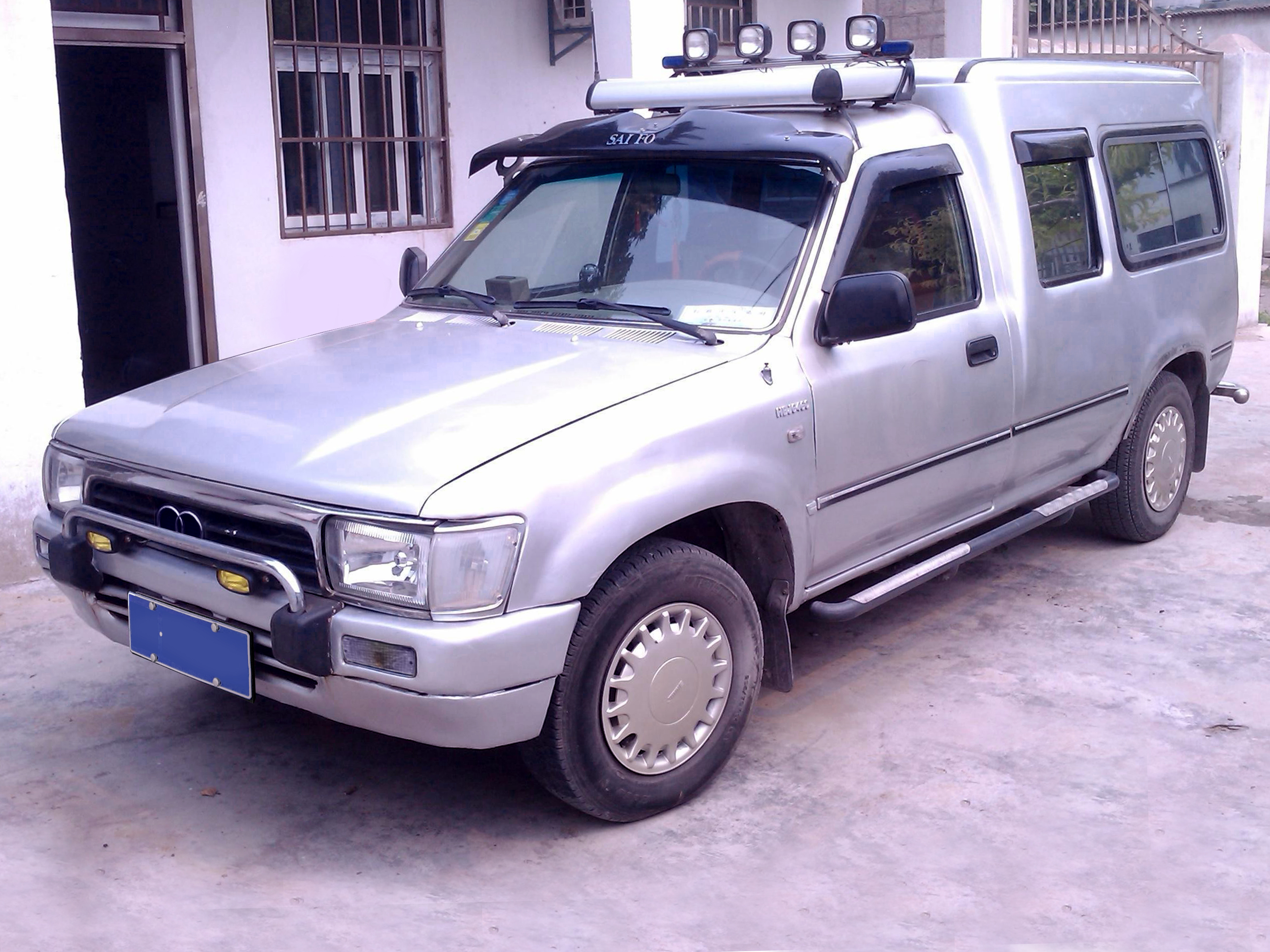
Shuanghuan Jiaolian/Laifu front quarter

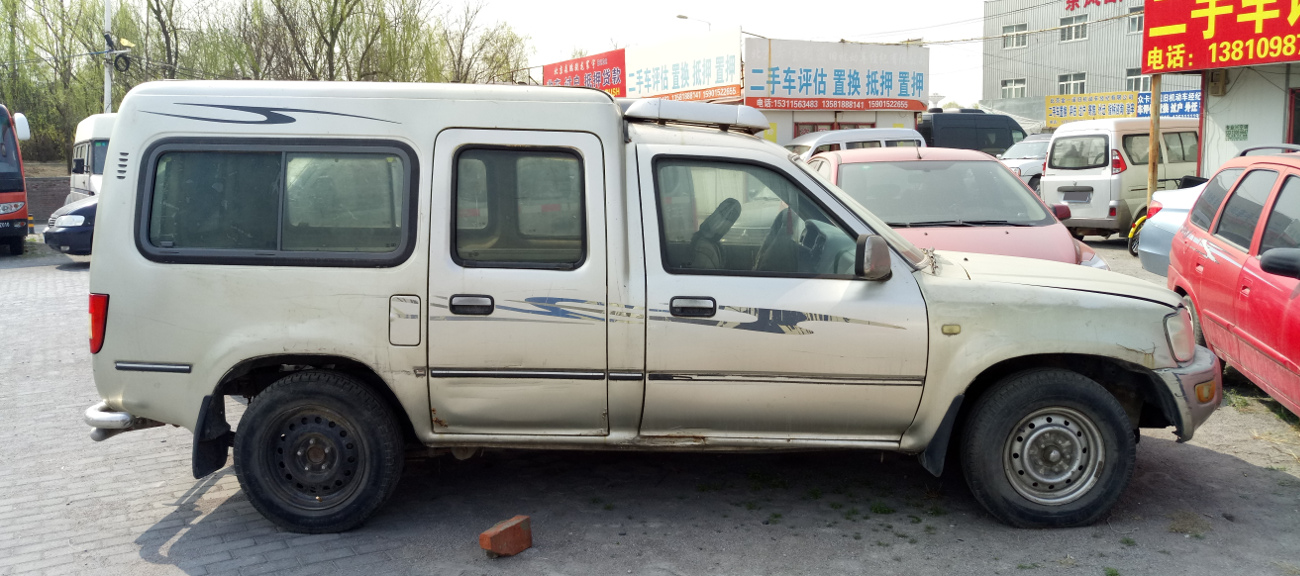
Shuanghuan Laiwang side

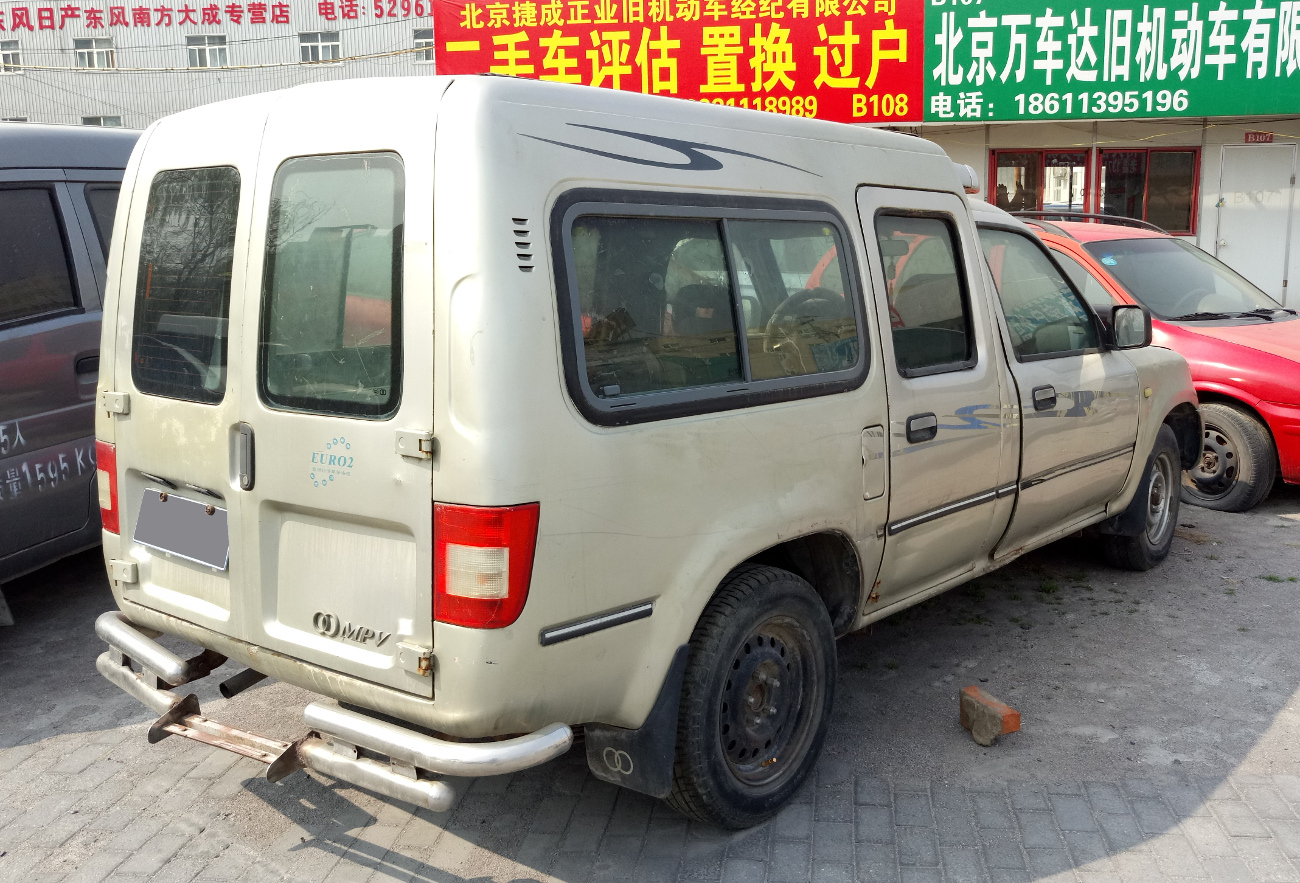
Shuanghuan Laiwang rear quarter
