= Shuanghuan Laibao =

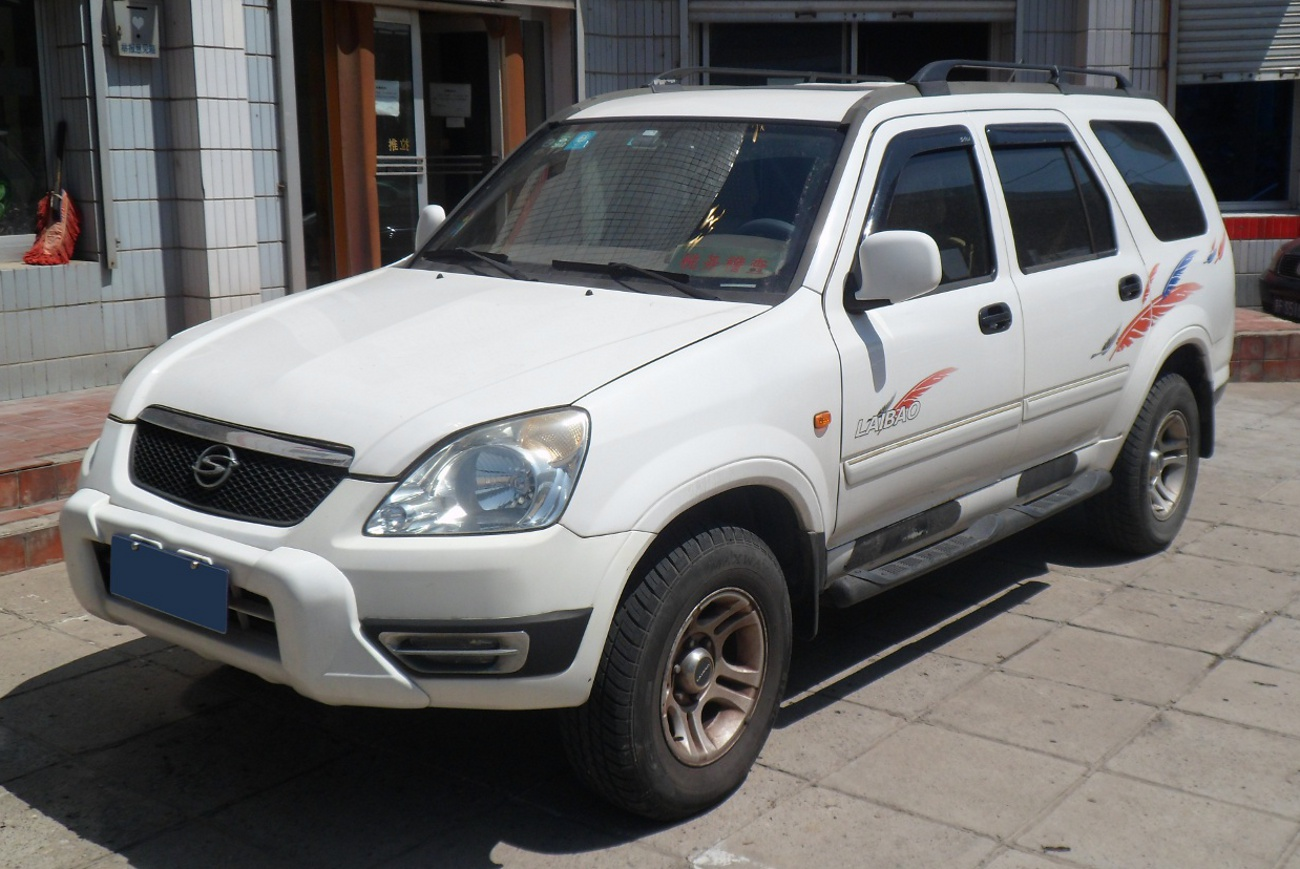

Overview
- Also called: Shuanghuan Laibao S-RV; Shuanghuan Rabo S-RV; Shuanghuan Rabo; Xinkai S-RV
- Production: 2003–2010
- Model years: 2004–2010 (Shuanghuan Laibao S-RV)
- Assembly: Shijiazhuang, Hebei, China

Body and chassis
- Class: Mid-size SUV
- Body style: 5-door SUV
- Layout: Front-engine, rear-wheel-drive

Powertrain
- Engine: EQ491i 2.0L petrol I4; JM491Q-ME 2.2L petrol I4; 4G63V16 2.4 L petrol I4
- Transmission: 5-speed manual

Dimensions
- Wheelbase: 2,850 mm (112 in)
- Length: 4,600 mm (180 in)
- Width: 1,770 mm (70 in)
- Height: 1,720 mm (68 in)

Chronology
- Predecessor: Shuanghuan Laiwang

The Shuanghuan Laibao (Chinese: 来宝) or Shuanghuan Laibao S-RV is a midsize SUV with the design inspired by the Honda CR-V. It was manufactured by Shuanghuan from 2003 to 2010, with the chassis based on the chassis of Shuanghuan Laiwang, which was designed based on the chassis of the fifth generation 1992 Toyota Hilux.

== Overview ==
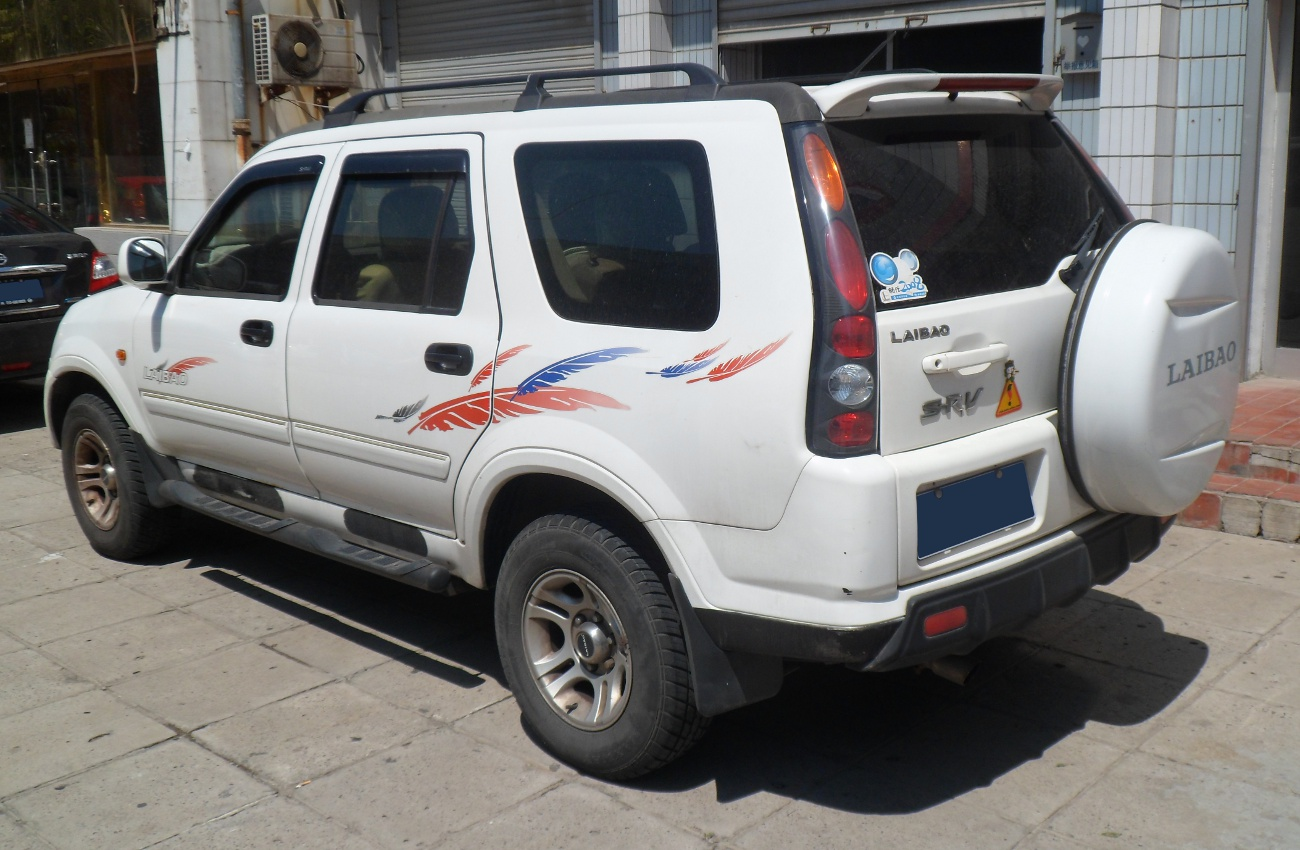
Shuanghuan Laibao S-RV rear quarter

The engine options of the Laibao S-RV includes a 2.0 liter inline-four engine producing 112 hp (84 kW) and 163 N⋅m (120 lbf⋅ft) of torque, a 2.2 liter inline-four engine producing 103 hp (77 kW) and 193 N⋅m (142 lbf⋅ft) of torque, and a 2.4 liter inline-four engine producing 125 hp (93 kW) and 190 N⋅m (140 lbf⋅ft) of torque, with all engines mated to a 5-speed manual gearbox.

Prices before discontinuation of the Laibao S-RV in 2004 ranges from 96,800 yuan to 115,800 yuan.

The design of the updated 2003 Shuanghuan Laibao S-RV is controversial as the midsize SUV heavily resembles the second generation Honda CR-V compact crossover.

== Intellectual property lawsuit ==
On November 13, 2003, Honda filed a lawsuit stating that the Shuanghuan Laibao is a violation of the intellectual property of Honda, as the Shuanghuan Laibao heavily resembles the second generation Honda CR-V. In March 2006, China's State Intellectual Property Office made the decision stating that Honda's patent for the design of the Honda CR-V compact crossover is invalid.

In 2010, the Beijing People's High Court finally made the decision that the Shuanghuan Laibao of Shijazhuang Shuanghuan Automobile Co. had infringed the design patent of the Honda CR-V. Shijazhuang Shuanghuan Automobile Co. has been fined 16 million yuan (equivalent to $2.4 million at that time), the final claim was 45 million yuan.
