= Honda CR-V =

Compact crossover SUV

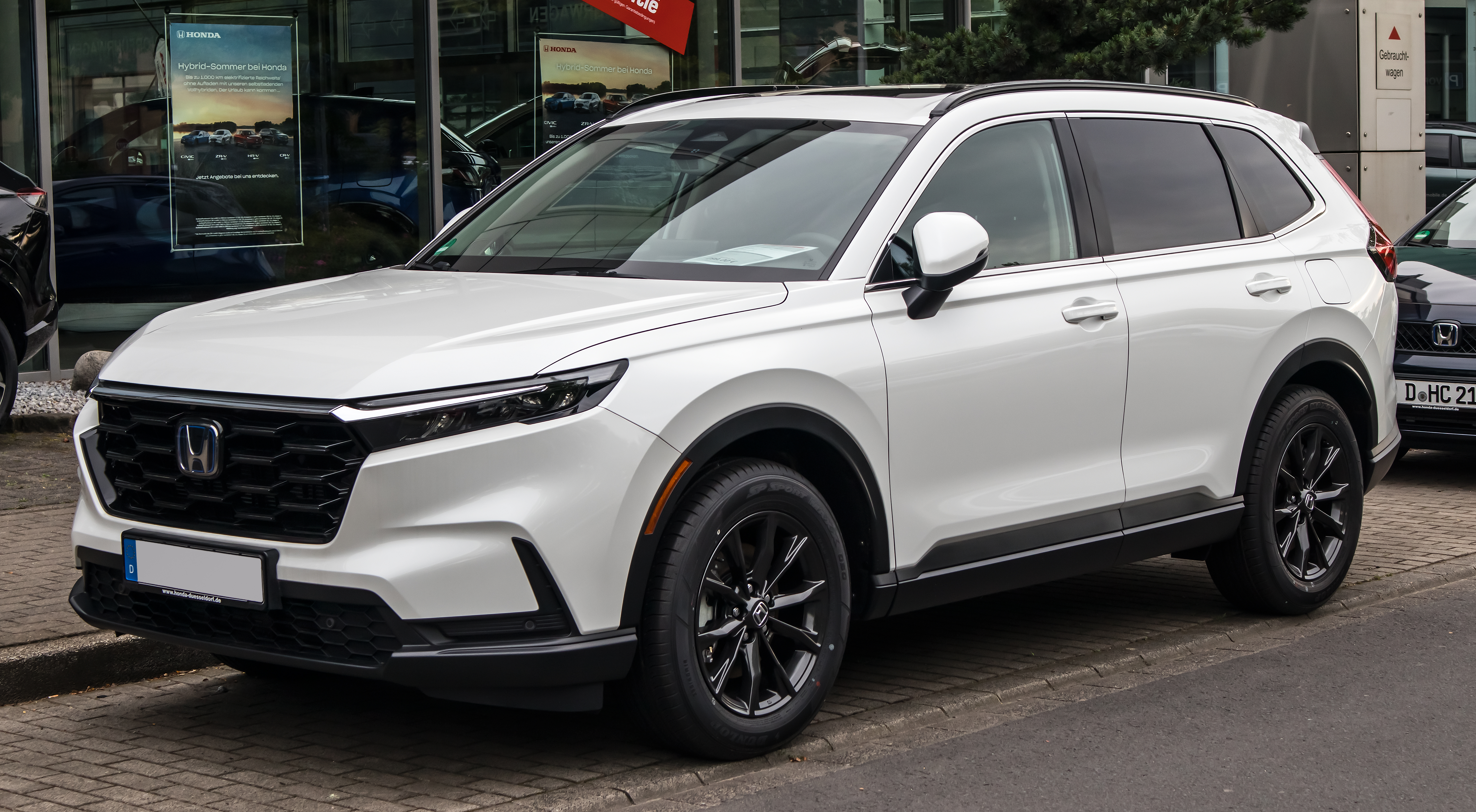
- 2023 Honda CR-V e:HEV

Overview
- Manufacturer: Honda
- Also called: Honda Breeze (China, 2019–present)
- Production: 1995–present

Body and chassis
- Class: Compact crossover SUV (C)
- Body style: 5-door SUV
- Layout: Front-engine, front-wheel-drive Front-engine, four-wheel-drive
- Chassis: Unibody

Chronology
- Predecessor: Honda Crossroad; Honda Civic Shuttle Beagle 4WD

The Honda CR-V (also sold as the Honda Breeze in China since 2019) is a compact crossover SUV manufactured by Japanese automaker Honda since 1995. Initial models of the CR-V were built using the same platform as the Civic.

Honda began producing the CR-V in Japan and United Kingdom, for worldwide markets, adding North American manufacturing sites in the United States and Mexico in 2007, and Canada in 2012. The CR-V is also produced in Wuhan for the Chinese market by Dongfeng Honda, and also marketed as the Breeze in China for the version produced at Guangzhou by Guangqi Honda.

Honda states that "CR-V" stands for "Comfortable Runabout Vehicle," while the term "Compact Recreational Vehicle" was used in a British car review article that was republished by Honda, associating the model name with the Sports Utility Vehicle abbreviation of SU-V.

As of 2022, the CR-V is positioned between the smaller ZR-V (marketed as HR-V in North America) — with which the CR-V shares a platform — and the larger North American market Passport/Pilot or the Chinese market Avancier/UR-V. It was the second best-selling SUV globally in 2020.

== First generation (1995) ==
First generation
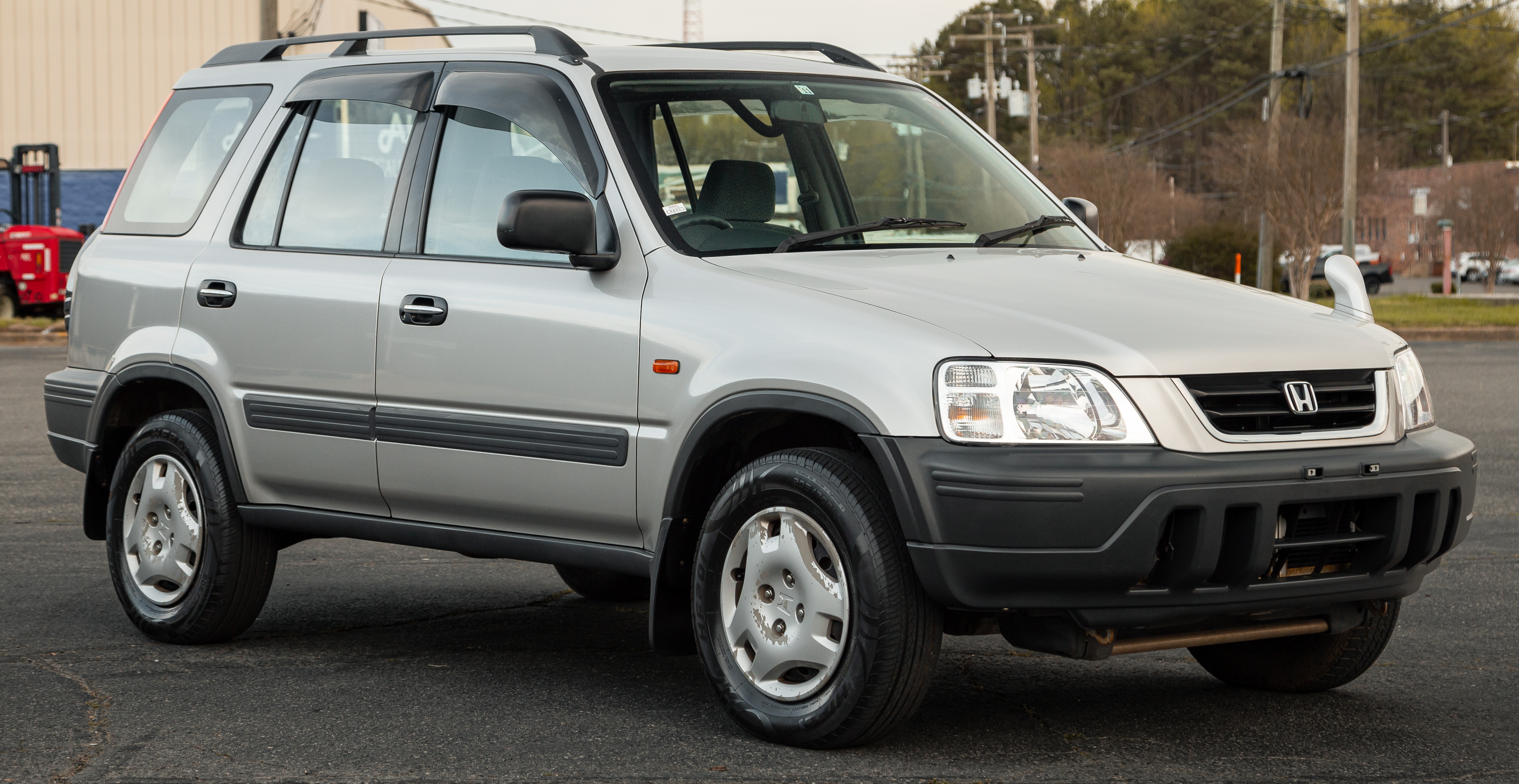
- Pre-facelift (1995–1999)

Overview
- Model code: RD1; RD2; RD3
- Production: 1995–2001
- Model years: 1997–2001
- Assembly: Japan: Sayama; United Kingdom: Swindon (HUKM); Taiwan: Hsinchu; Thailand: Ayutthaya; Philippines: Santa Rosa, Laguna; Indonesia: North Jakarta (HPM, 2000–2002); Malaysia: Johor Bahru (Kah Motor, 2000–2002)
- Designer: Hiroyuki Kawase (1993)

Body and chassis
- Related: Honda Civic (sixth generation); Honda Integra

Powertrain
- Engine: Petrol: 2.0 L B20B/B20Z I4
- Transmission: 5-speed SBXM manual (AWD); 5-speed SKH manual (FWD); 4-speed MDLA/MDMA automatic

Dimensions
- Wheelbase: 2,620 mm (103.1 in); 2,625 mm (103.3 in) (post-facelift)
- Length: 4,510 mm (177.6 in)
- Width: 1,780 mm (70.1 in)
- Height: 1,678–1,770 mm (66.1–69.7 in)

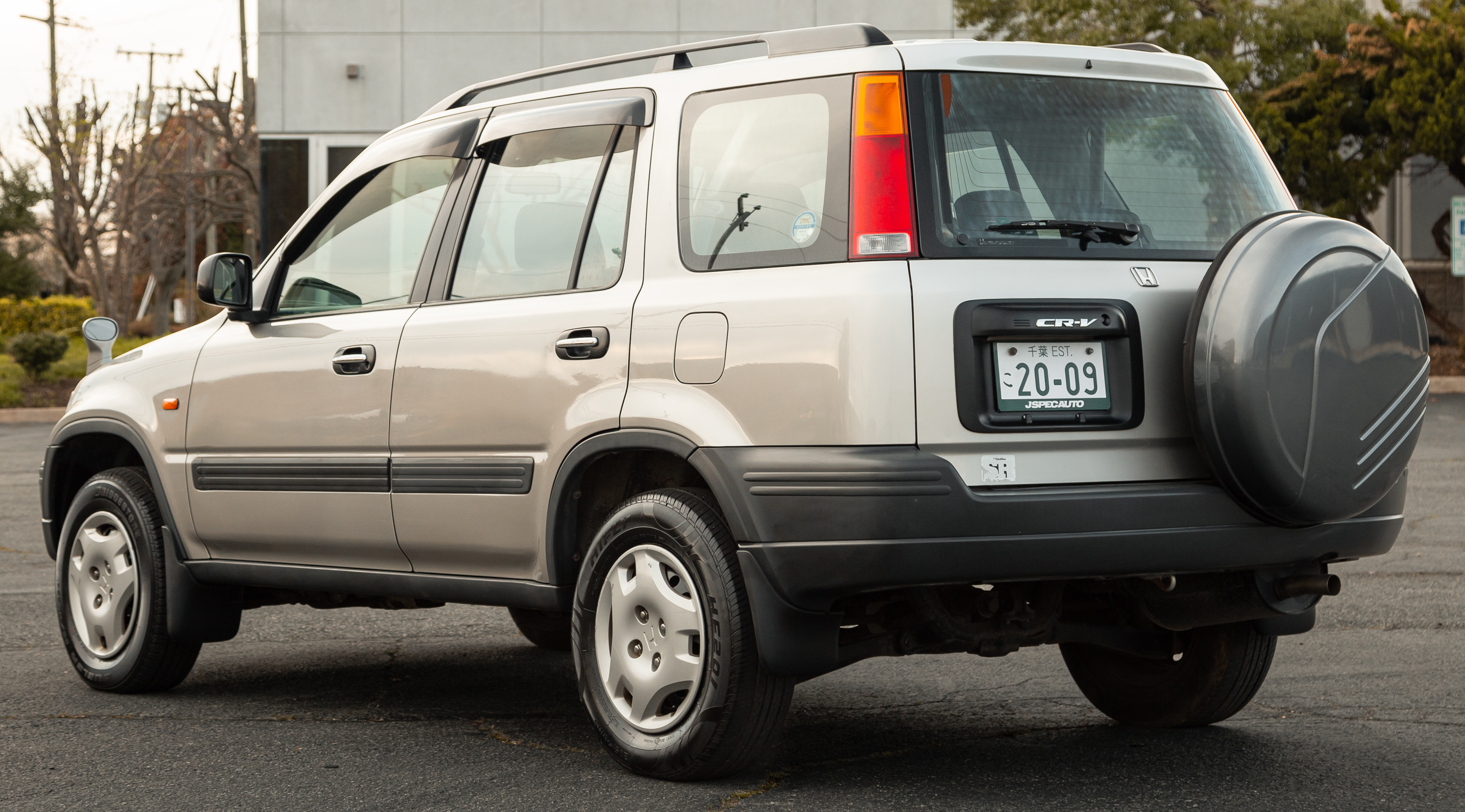
Pre-facelift (1995–1999)

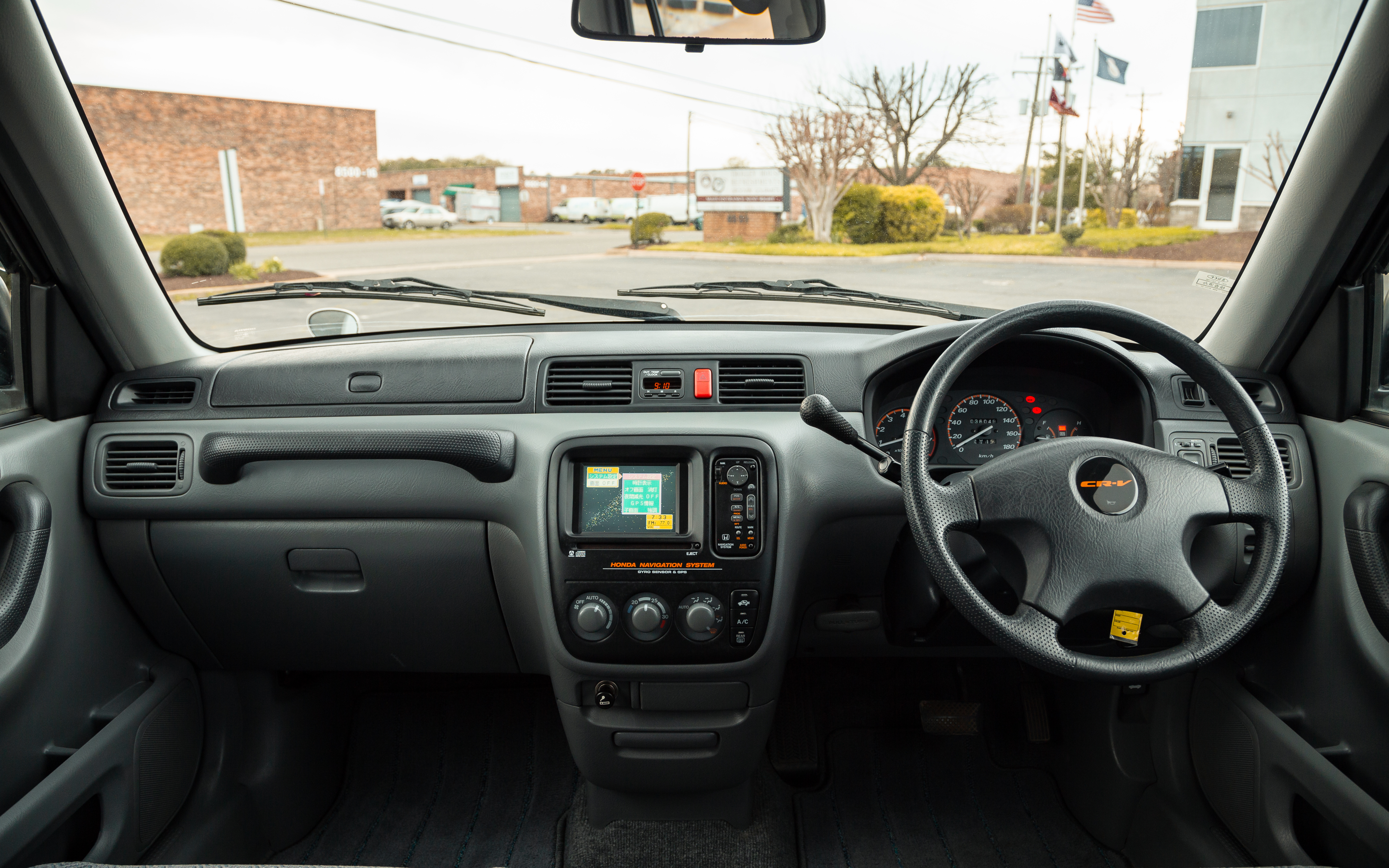
Interior

The first generation CR-V or RD1 was Honda's first in-house designed sport utility vehicle by Hiroyuki Kawase.

When the CR-V was introduced in Japan in October 1995 it was sold only at Honda Verno and Honda Primo dealerships and exceeded Japanese government's compact car regulations regarding exterior dimensions (maximum width of 1,700 mm (66.9 in), therefore incurred a more expensive annual road tax obligation.

For the North American market, it was displayed at the 1996 Chicago Auto Show and went on sale in February 1997.

Upon introduction, the model had only one trim level, which would later be known as the LX model trim; it was powered by the 2.0-litre straight-four B20B. Outer dimensions for this engine would be identical to the Integra's 1.8 L engine, but internally the engine had a larger 84 mm (3.3 in) bore vs 81 mm (3.2 in) for the Integra, to add the extra displacement needed to produce more torque. The engine used a one-piece cylinder sleeve construction unique from any other B-series engine. The chassis and suspension were largely similar to the 4th-generation Honda Civic Shuttle (Wagon) with a unibody design with fully independent suspension. The vehicle's suspension was double wishbone, while the rear used a trailing-arm-based multilink system. The rear seats were able to fold down and integrate with front seats that could fold flat, such that they formed a bed of sorts, about the size of a twin bed. Also, a picnic table was stowed in the rear floor area. All models featured plastic cladding covering the front bumper, rear bumper, and fender wells. In most countries, CR-Vs had a chrome grille; however, in the United States, the grille was made out of the same black plastic as the bumpers. The EX included anti-lock brakes and 15-inch alloy wheels over the LX trim. Drivetrain options were front-wheel drive or Honda's Real Time AWD.

The Indonesian market CR-V was released in 1999 as a locally assembled model. Honda customized the Indonesian model to include face-to-face third-row seating, making it a seven-seater vehicle to take advantage of the tax regulations in the country. The rear foglamp was also reconfigured as a fourth and fifth brake light.

=== Facelift ===
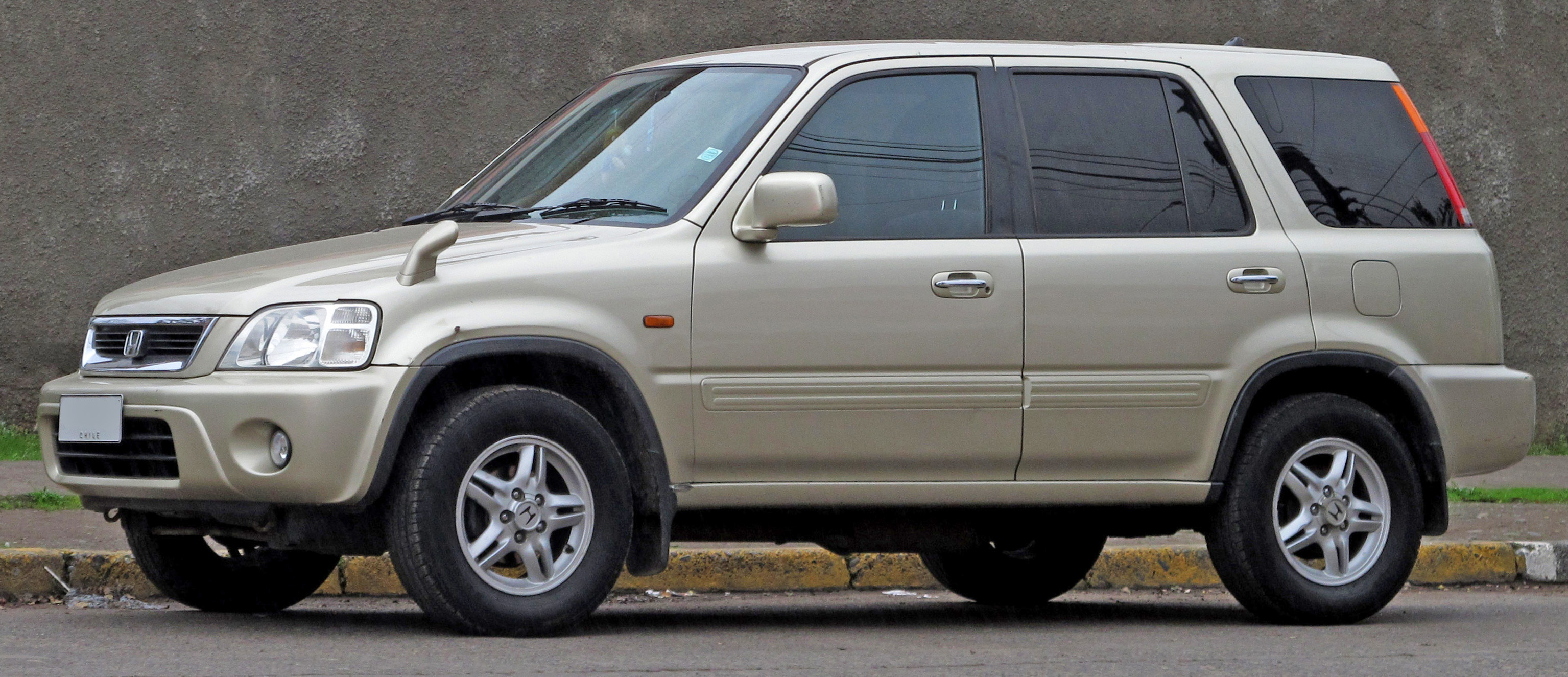

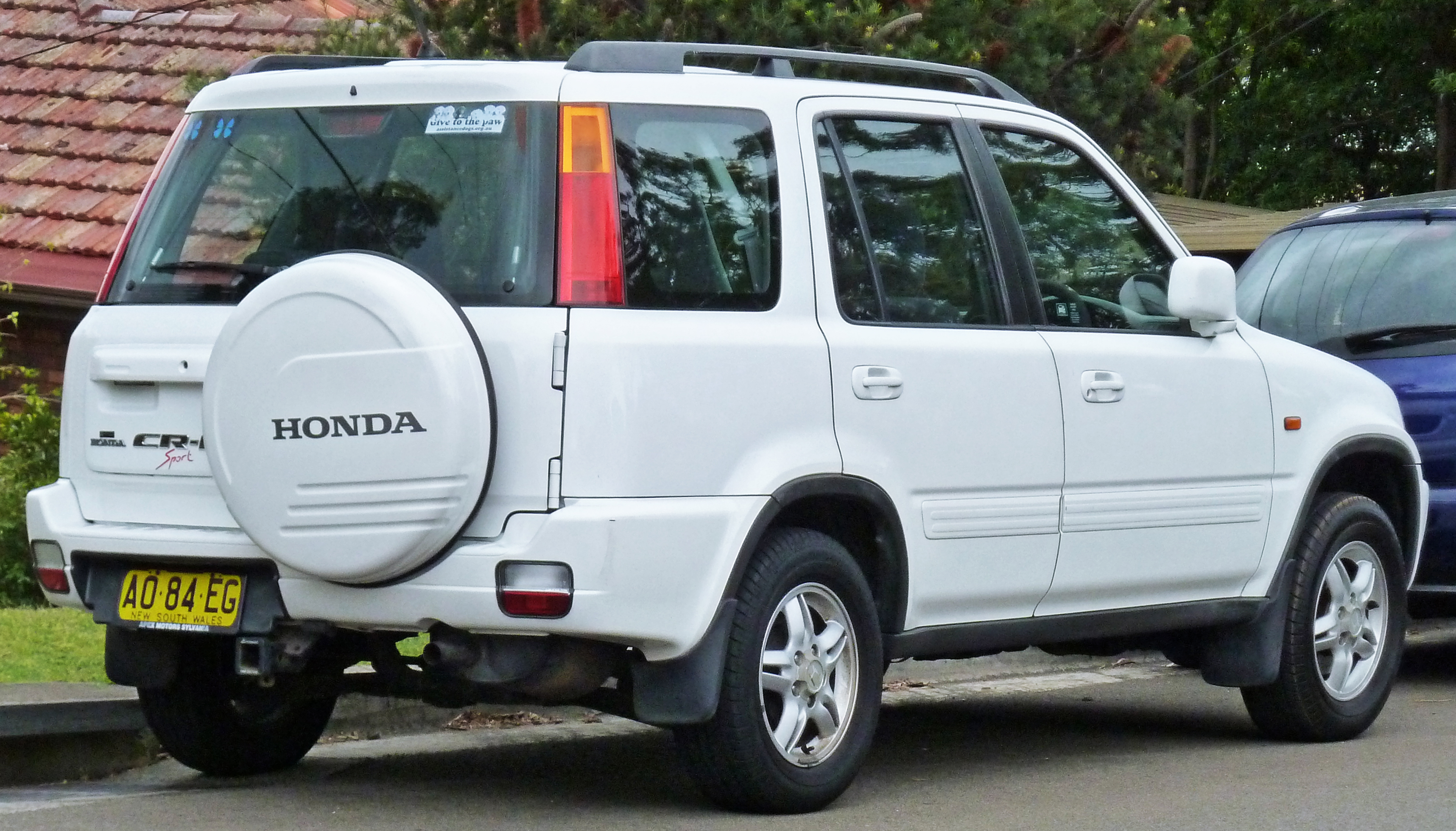
Facelift (1999–2001)

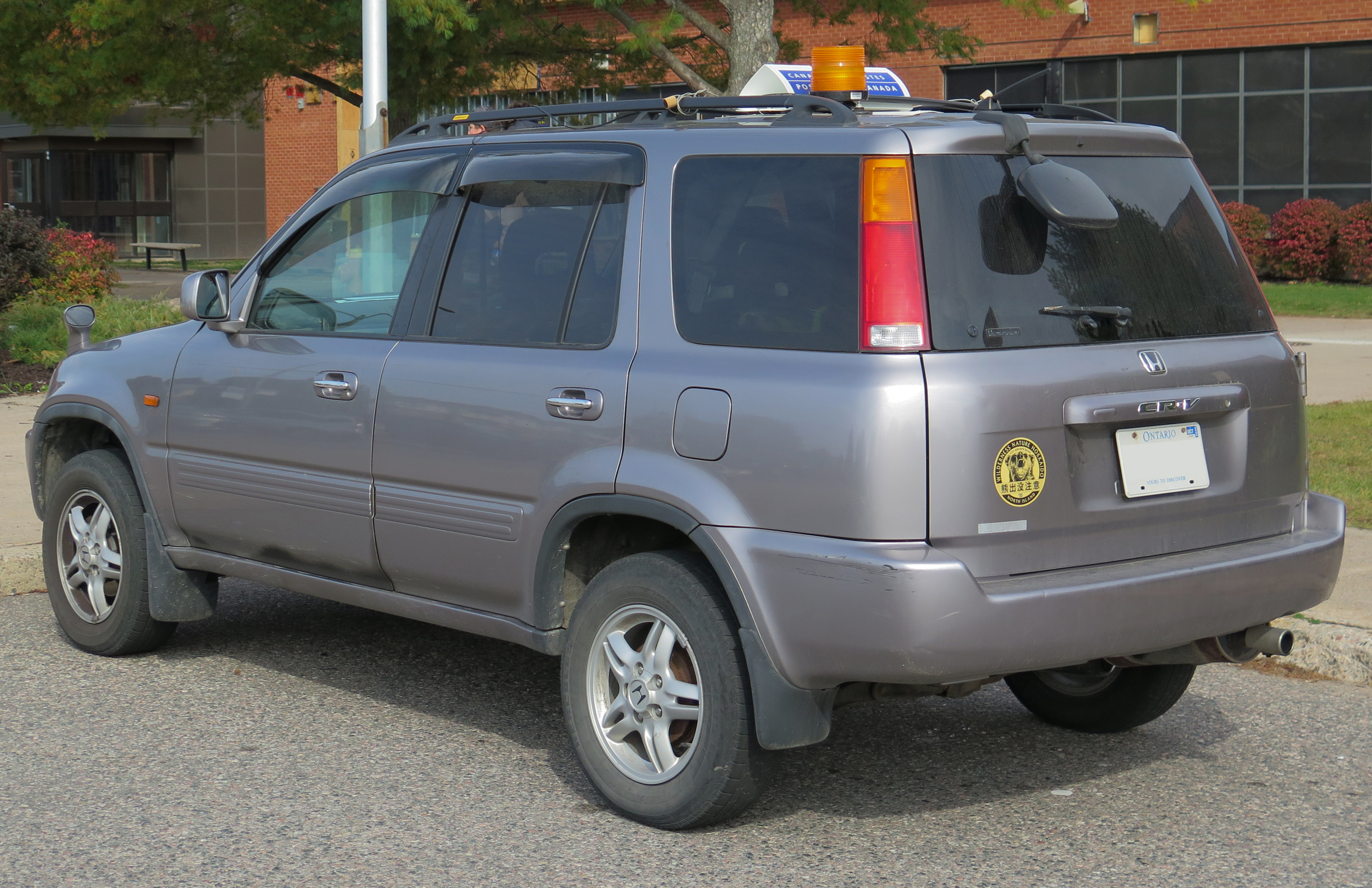
Honda CR-V Fullmark (facelift)

For the 2000 model year, the European, Australian and Asian CR-V models featured more drastic changes. Exterior alterations included a new front bumper, smoothed off rear bumper, and a smaller plastic radio antenna on the rear of the roof. Some of the paint options changed. European models received an enlarged Honda emblem on the front grille, and a new metallic yellow paint in certain markets.

The engine was changed to the 2.0 L B20Z engine, producing 147 hp (110 kW) at 6,200 rpm and 133 lb⋅ft (180 N⋅m) of torque at 4,500 rpm. This improved performance for the 3,200 lb (1,500 kg) vehicle. Fuel economy of 23 mpg_{‑US} (10 L/100 km; 28 mpg_{‑imp}) city/28 mpg_{‑US} (8.4 L/100 km; 34 mpg_{‑imp}) highway (US) and price were not affected by the increase in power, which was the result of a higher compression ratio (9.6:1 compared to the B20B's 8.8:1), a new intake manifold, and slightly higher lift on the intake valves. This 16 percent increase in power resulted to a faster 0–60 mph of 8.6 seconds on the 5-speed manual 4wd.

In 2000, an SE (Special Edition) model was introduced in North America. The SE featured body-coloured bumpers and side moldings, a body-coloured hard spare tire cover, leather upholstery, CD/cassette audio deck, rear privacy glass, and chrome grille accent. Until 2001, the CR-V sold more than any other vehicle in its class. The North American models also received new exterior colours including Naples Gold Metallic and Taffeta White. Electron Blue was introduced in 2000 to replace Submarine Blue Pearl, while Satin Silver Metallic replaced Sebring Silver Metallic in 2001. However, that year, sales of the Ford Escape and its clone, the Mazda Tribute, surpassed those of the CR-V.

The Australian higher specification model was called the "Sport". It was added at the time of the first facelift and included body-coloured bumpers, mirrors, door handles, and hard rear spare wheel cover. It also included alloy wheels, roof rails, and a large glass sunroof. The CR-V became Australia's best-selling SUV in 2000, outselling the Toyota Land Cruiser for the first time.

=== Safety ===
The 1997–2001 model tested by the Insurance Institute for Highway Safety (IIFHS) was the LX model with standard driver and passenger airbags. The car's structure received an acceptable rating, and the overall car received a marginal rating — as the dummy's left leg would have been broken. In addition to this lower body injury, the dummy's head went through the airbag which may have caused a minor concussion. The chest was well protected.

Models equipped with an automatic transmission now had an override cancel button that allowed the driver to lock the transmission in the first three gears to provide power for passing and climbing grades along with providing hill assist when stationary, known as "Grade Logic." The pattern of the cloth on the seats was also redesigned, and the head restraints earned an acceptable rating from the IIHS for whiplash protection.

=== Engines ===
Model name	Power	Capacity	Fuel	Year of construction
B20Z2	148 HP	1,972 cc	Petrol	1998–2001
B20B4	128 HP	1,973 cc	Petrol	1996–1998
B20Z1	147 HP	1,973 cc	Petrol	1999–2002
B20B	128 HP	1,973 cc	Petrol	1995–2001

== Second generation (2002) ==
Second generation
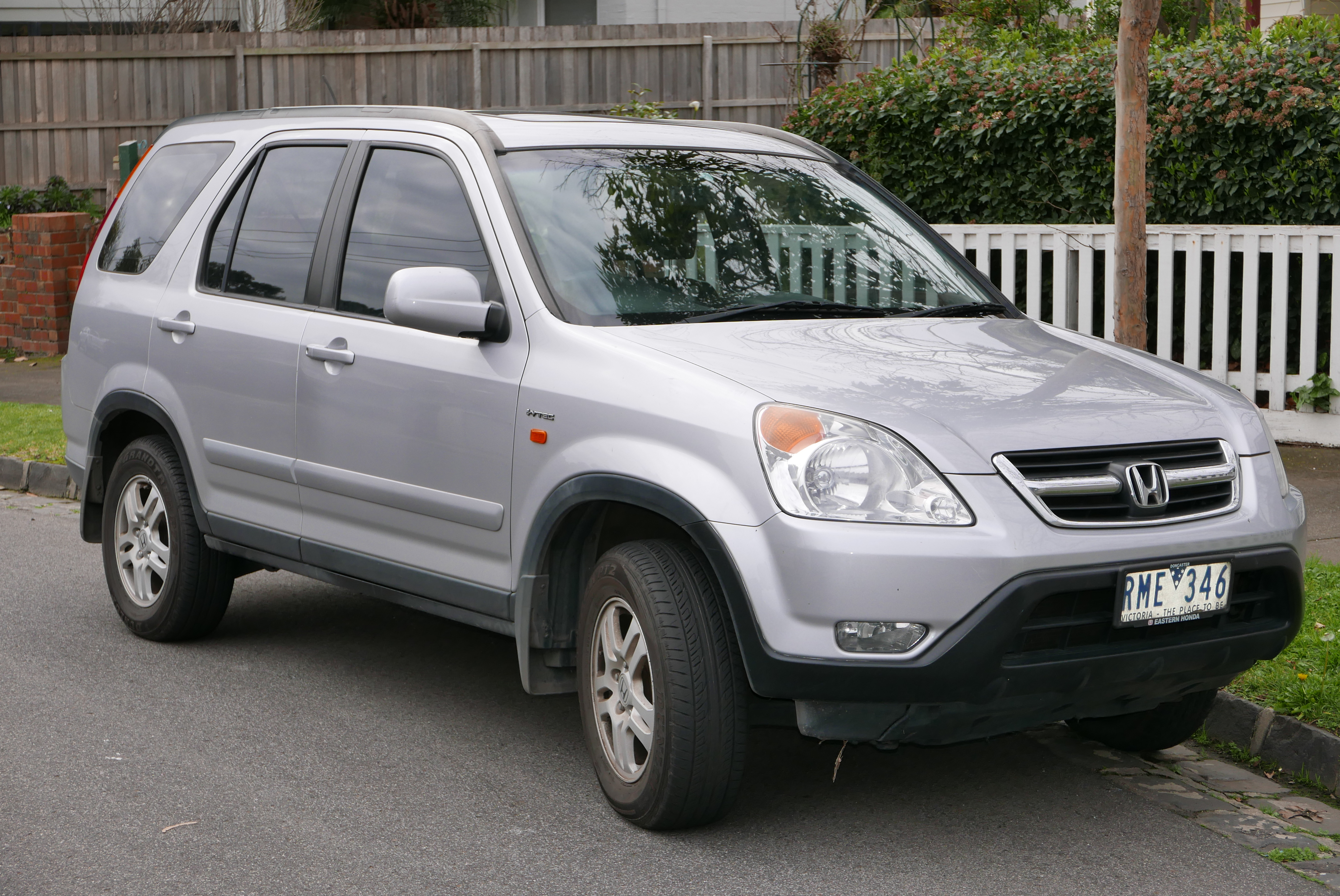
- Pre-facelift (2001–2004)

Overview
- Model code: RD4; RD5; RD6; RD7; RD8; RD9
- Production: 2001–2006
- Model years: 2002–2006
- Assembly: Japan: Sayama, Saitama; United Kingdom: Swindon (HUKM); China: Wuhan (Dongfeng Honda); Taiwan: Pingtung; Thailand: Ayutthaya; Malaysia: Alor Gajah, Melaka; Philippines: Santa Rosa, Laguna; Indonesia: Karawang (HPM, May 2002 – December 2006); India: Greater Noida (HCIL)
- Designer: Mitsuhiro Honda (1999)

Body and chassis
- Related: Honda Civic (seventh generation); Honda FR-V; Honda Element; Honda Integra DC5

Powertrain
- Engine: Petrol: 2.0 L K20A4 I4; 2.4 L K24A1 I4; Diesel: 2.2 L N22A2 turbo I4
- Transmission: 5-speed manual 4-speed automatic 5-speed automatic 6-speed manual

Dimensions
- Wheelbase: 2,620–2,625 mm (103.1–103.3 in)
- Length: 4,535–4,600 mm (178.5–181.1 in)
- Width: 1,785 mm (70.3 in)
- Height: 1,680–1,780 mm (66.1–70.1 in)

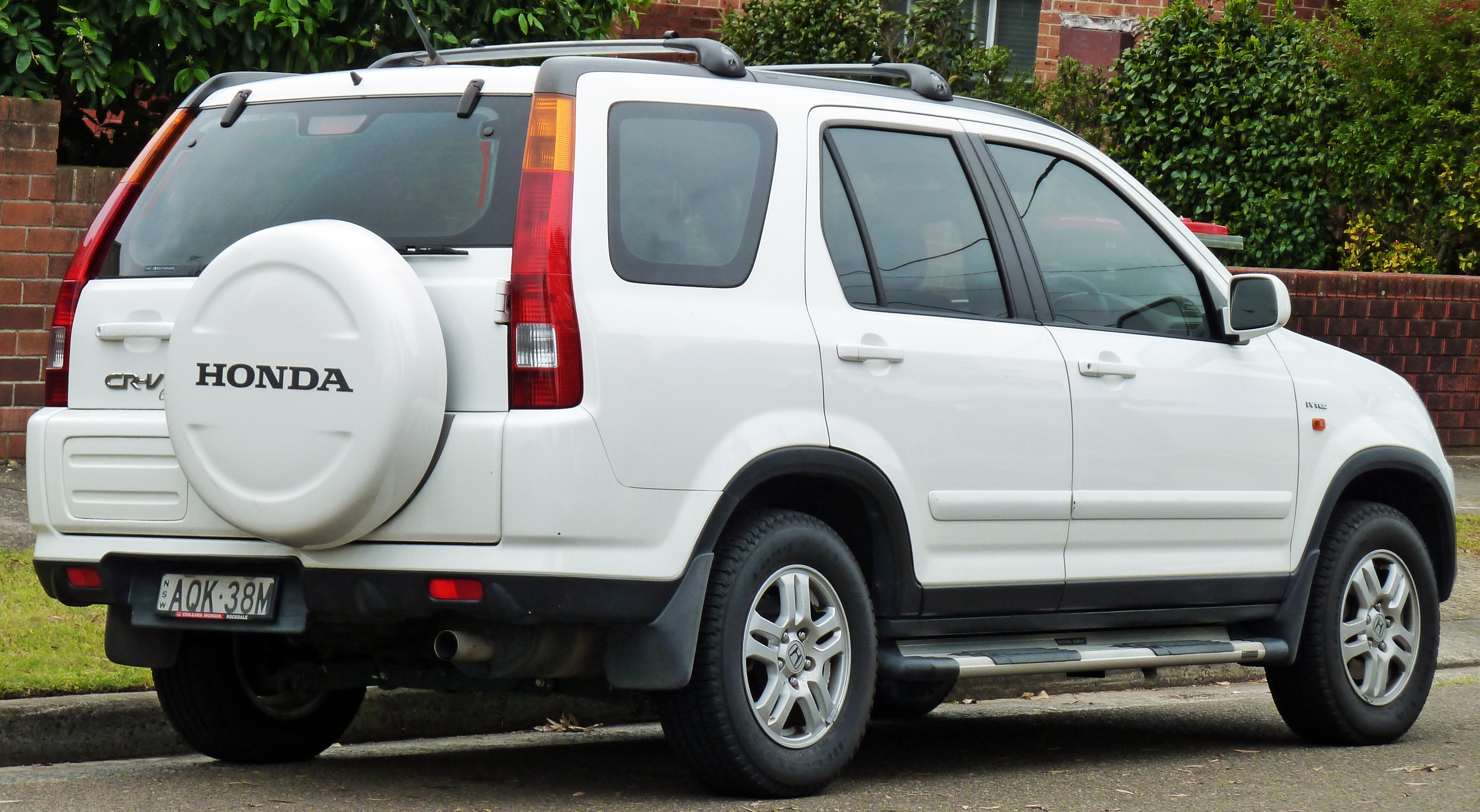
Honda CR-V (pre-facelift)

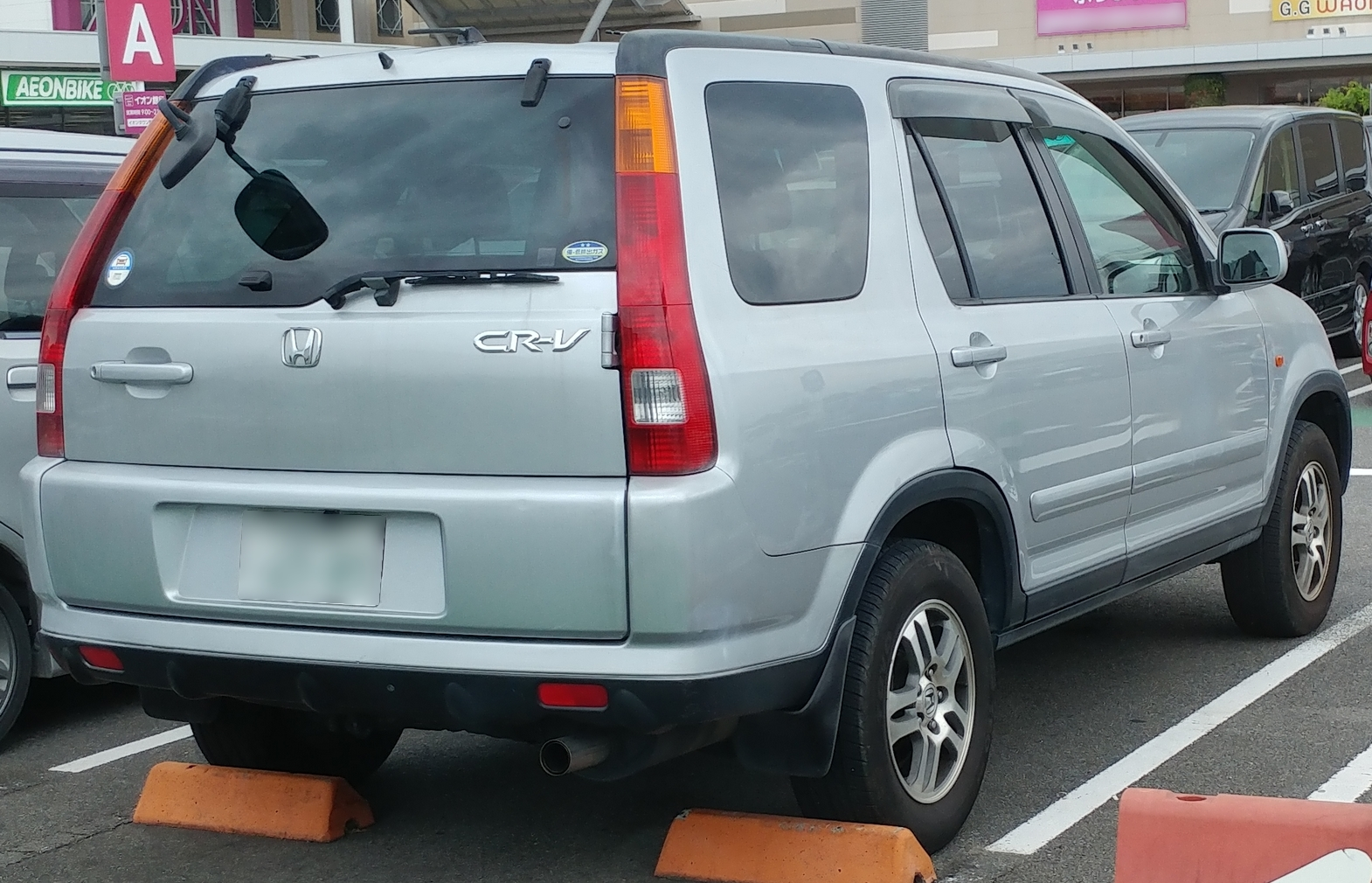
Honda CR-V Fullmark (pre-facelift)

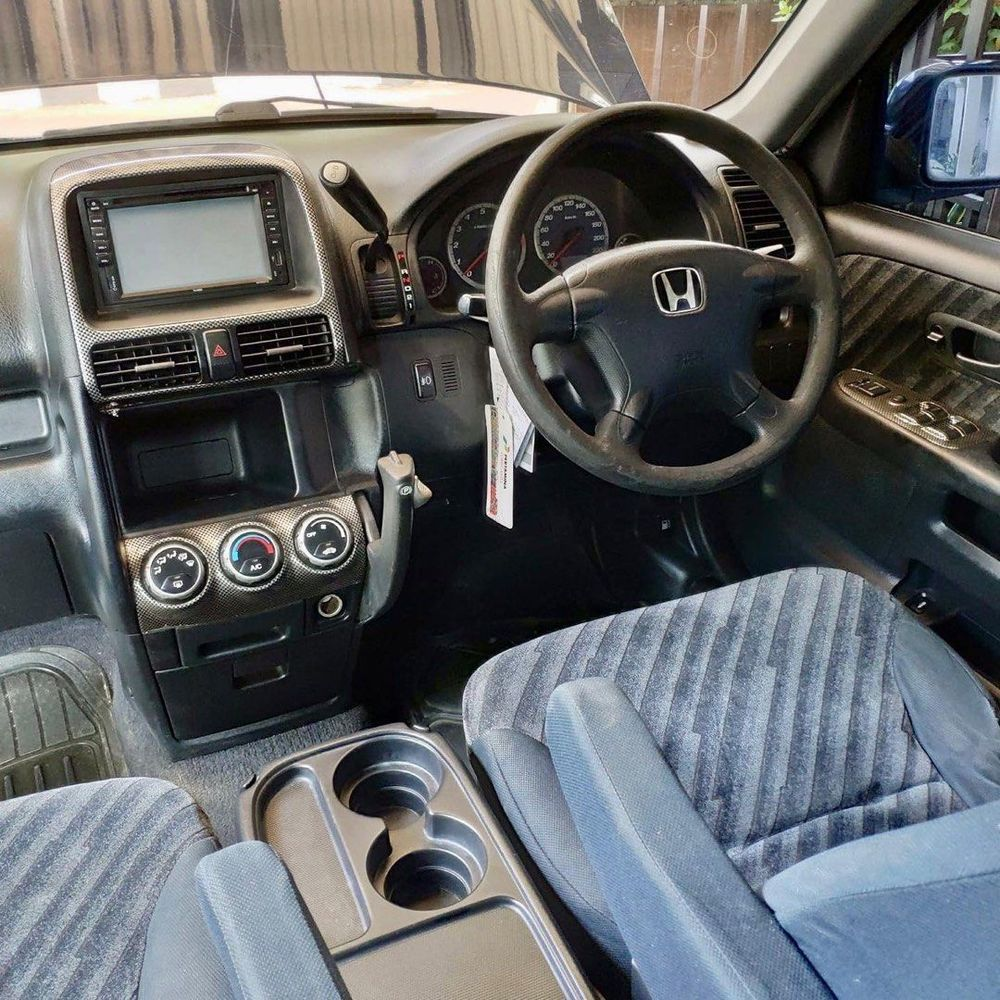
Interior

The second generation CR-V, which went on sale on 13 November 2001, was a full redesign, based on the seventh generation Civic, and powered by the K24A1 engine, or the K20A4 engine in Southeast Asia. Southeast Asian models produced 150 hp (112 kW) of power and 190 N⋅m (140 lbf⋅ft) while the North American versions of the new engine produced 160 hp (119 kW) and 219 N⋅m (162 lbf⋅ft) of torque. Per new SAE regulations, the same North American K24A1 engine is now rated at 156 hp (116 kW) and 160 lb⋅ft (217 N⋅m). The new CR-V retained the fuel economy of the previous model because of the i-VTEC system. The new chassis had increased torsional and bending rigidity, the suspension included a front toe control link MacPherson struts and a rear reactive-link double wishbone; the compact rear suspension increased cargo space to 72 cu ft (2,000 L). The second generation CR-V was Car and Driver magazine's Best Small SUV for 2002 and 2003.

Second generation CR-Vs in countries outside of North America were again offered in both "low specification" and "high specification" variants, with the latter featuring body-coloured bumpers and fittings. It also now did not require the glass hatch to be opened before the swinging door. Changes between model years 2002, 2003, and 2004 were minor, involving an enlargement of the centre compartment bin and the addition of a front passenger door power lock in the latter two years, respectively. The Honda FR-V was based on the second generation CR-V.

In China, a clone from Shuanghuan Auto, called the Laibao S-RV, became the centre of a design rights controversy, because the latter appeared to be a blatant copy of Honda's design.

=== Facelift ===
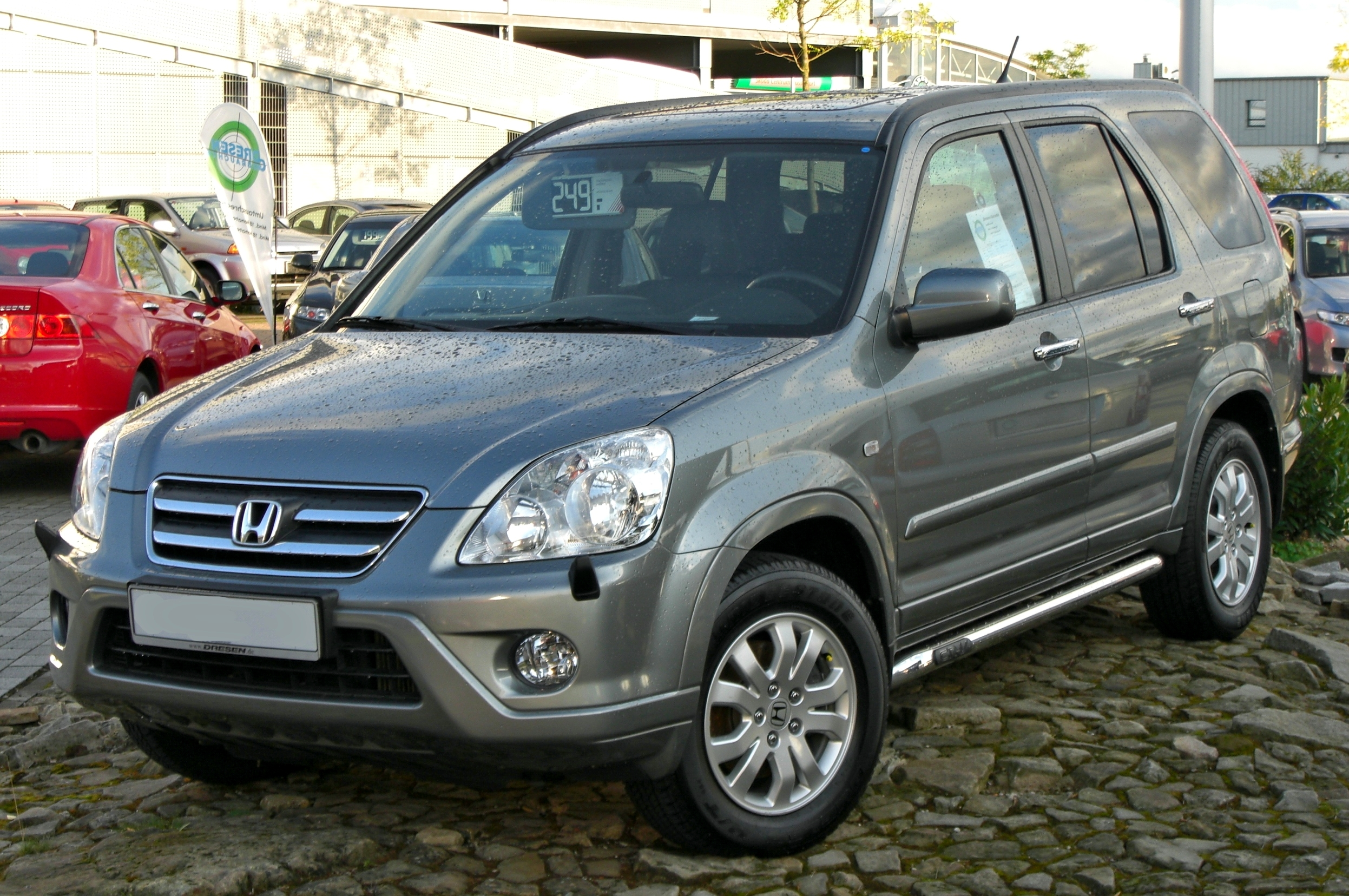

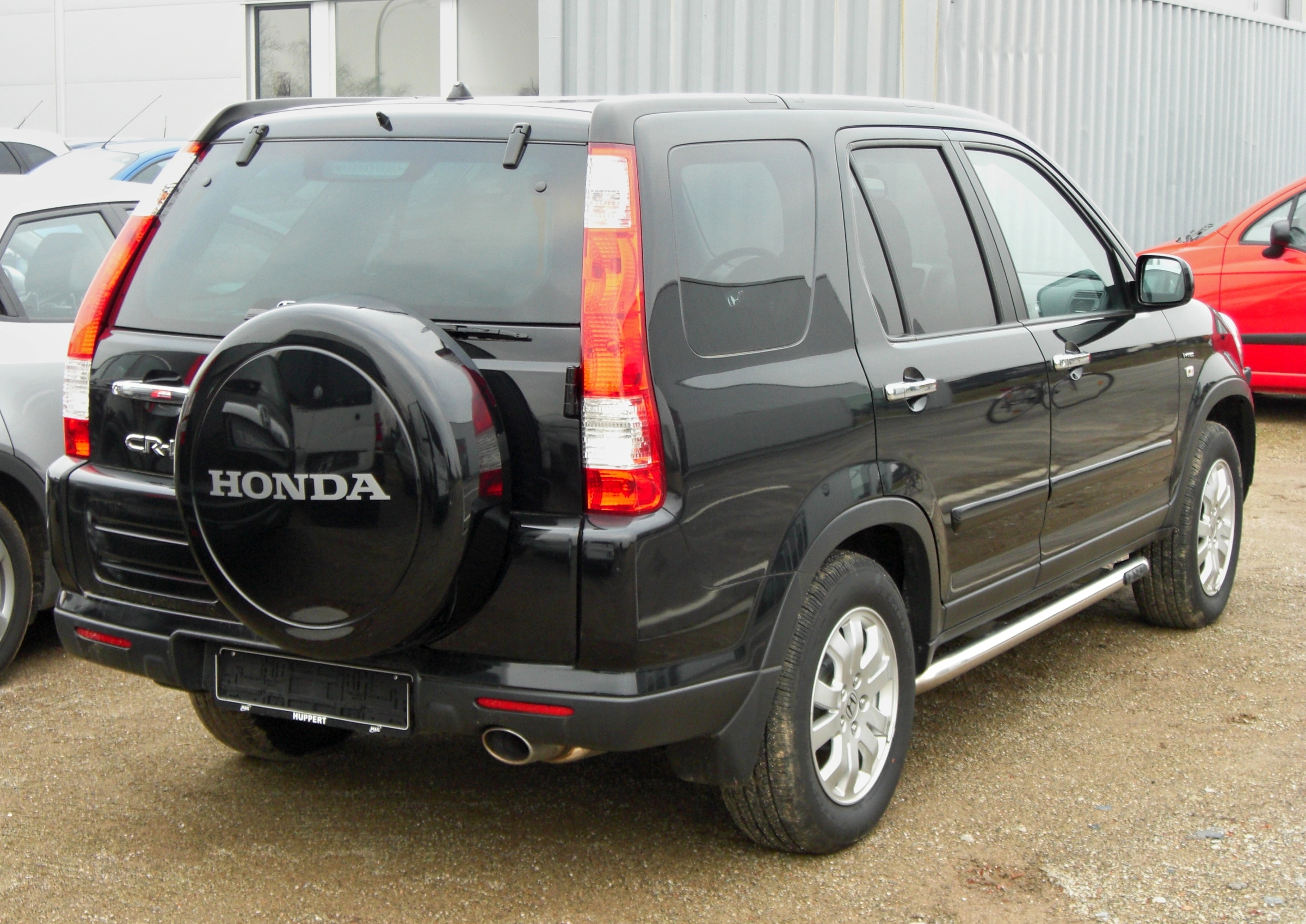
Facelift (2004–2006)

In 2004, for the 2005 model year, the CR-V received a mid-cycle refresh. New 16-inch wheels replaced the previous 15-inch versions. Changes included new taillights and headlights with clear indicators and separate H1 bulbs for low beam and high beam, the previous setup used an H4 single bulb for both low beam and high beam. The taillights received clear lenses instead of amber for the turning indicators. The grille was also changed; it had two horizontal bars instead of one. The front bumper design was slightly changed to round fog lights compared to the previous trapezium fog lights and, in addition, the lower grille had two horizontal bars instead of one. The rear bumper reflectors were longer and narrower.

On the inside of the car, the EX trim received standard upgrades which included steering wheel-mounted audio controls, an outside temperature monitor and also an electric sunroof. The stereo system was also XM Satellite Radio ready in US-market vehicles. All CR-V models also received redesigned rear seat headrests, intended to improve rear visibility.

Mechanically, the 2005 model was also changed. A drive-by-wire throttle was implemented for all CR-Vs. The all-wheel drive system's engagement threshold was altered for improved response. US market models were equipped with a five-speed automatic, as opposed to the previous four-speed automatic.

In the United States and Canada, all 2005 MY and later CR-Vs have anti-lock brakes, electronic brake force distribution, traction control and Vehicle Stability Assist, front seat-mounted side airbags, and side-curtain airbags with rollover sensors for all occupants.

In Australia, the MY05 facelift went on sale in late 2004. Base models made do with only dual airbags and ABS as standard equipment, while the Sport came equipped with side airbags for the first time. Curtain airbags were not available on any model until the next generation.

Following the tradition of adding a trim level above the EX during the refresh, like the first generation CR-V, Honda added the SE trim level for the 2005 CR-V. The CR-V SE featured painted bumpers, body side molding, and a hard, body-coloured spare tire cover. Honda introduced leather seats to the CR-V for the first time with this trim, as well as a leather-wrapped steering wheel, heated side mirrors, and front seats.

=== Australia ===
This iteration of CR-V arrived in Australia on 1 January 2002, and initially came in two guises, "Base" and "Sport". The "CR-V" (or "Base") included dual front airbags, air conditioning, power windows and mirrors, and a CD player. Building upon the "CR-V" specification, the Sport added ABS, Cruise Control, a sunroof, 15-inch alloy wheels, front fog-lights, and body coloured bumpers and mirrors. Consistently selling very well within the Medium SUV segment within the previous generation, amassing over 40,000 units between 1997 and 2001, the second generation continued its success, becoming the best selling SUV in 2002 and selling over 12,000 units.

Several "Special Edition" models were released, beginning in 2003. The "Winter Classic" and "Sport Winter Classic" were sold in Winter/Spring 2003. Building upon the "Base", the Winter Classic added alloy wheels, side steps, and a tow bar, while the Sport Winter Classic gained roof racks, nudge bar, and foglights, but did without the towbar. Later within this iteration, in 2005, an SE model was launched, featuring rear parking sensors, nudge bar and 16-inch alloy wheels. It was sold between October and November 2005. Running throughout 2006, the CR-V "Extra" brought with it 16-inch alloy wheels and side airbags.

=== Philippines ===
In the Philippines, the second-generation CR-V was released in 2002. The vehicle was reconfigured to seat 10 people, with 3 in front, 4 in the second row, and 3 in the third row to take advantage of the tax regulations in the country at the time which allows a 10-seater vehicle to be classified as a "mass transport van", therefore exempt from excise tax. The 10-seater configuration also allowed the vehicle to compete with Asian utility vehicles (AUV), while 5-seater and 8-seater variants are also available. It was produced locally at the factory in Santa Rosa, Laguna, with 63 percent local content. In its 4-year production run, Honda sold 20,886 units of the second-generation CR-V in the Philippines.

=== Engines ===
Engine	Chassis code	Horsepower	Torque
2.0 L K20A4 I4	RD4 (FWD, Asia); RD5 (AWD); RD8 (AWD, Europe)	150 hp (112 kW) at 6,500 rpm	140 lb⋅ft (190 N⋅m) at 4,000 rpm
2.4 L K24A1 I4	RD6 (FWD); RD7 (AWD)	160 hp (119 kW) at 6,000 rpm	162 lb⋅ft (220 N⋅m) at 3,600 rpm
2.2 L N22A2 I4	RD9 (AWD)	138 hp (103 kW) at 4,000 rpm	250 lb⋅ft (339 N⋅m) at 2,000 rpm

=== Safety ===
ANCAP test results* Honda CR-V 5 door wagon (2001)
Test	Score
Overall	4 /5 stars
Frontal offset	10.62/16
Side impact	16/16
Pole	0/2
Seat belt reminders	0/3
Whiplash protection	Not Assessed
Pedestrian protection	Adequate
Electronic stability control	Not Assessed

== Third generation (2007) ==
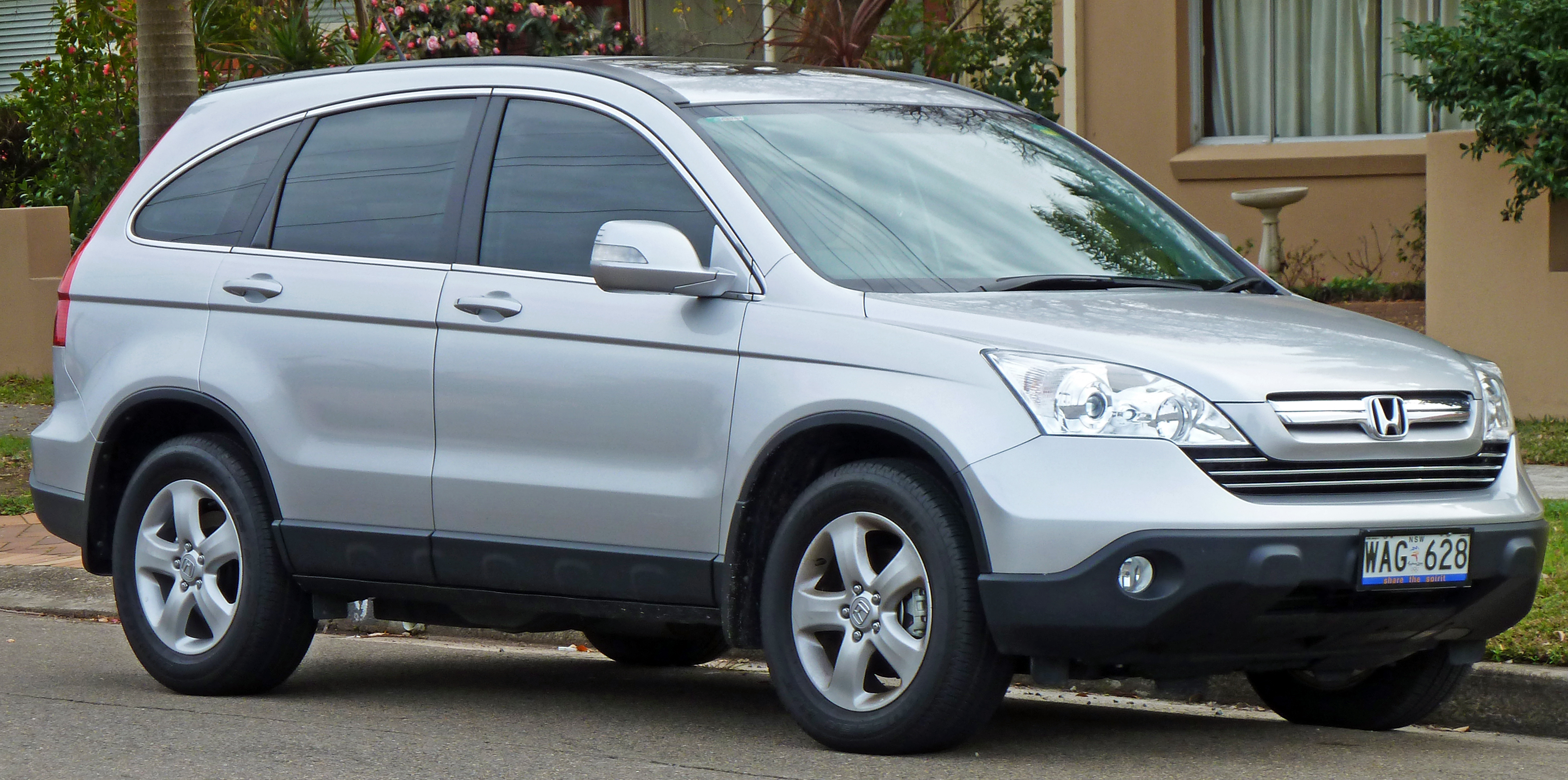
Third-generation CR-V (pre-facelift)

The third generation CR-V went on sale in the U.S. in late September 2006 for the 2007 model year. Portions of the body structure, drivetrain, and suspension were carried over from the previous model, while both interior and exterior styling elements were changed significantly. The CR-V now featured a rear liftgate and bottom-side spare tire mount rather than a side-opening rear door and door-mounted spare.

The third generation CR-V was powered by Honda's standard K-series 2.4 L inline-four engine. In North American markets, this engine's power is rated at 166 hp (124 kW) at 5,800 rpm and 161 lb⋅ft (218 N⋅m) at 4,200 rpm. A 2.2 L i-CTDI diesel engine was offered in the European and Asian markets. The European market CR-V had the R20A 2.0 L gasoline engine, based on the Honda R-series i-VTEC SOHC engine found in the Honda Civic, as opposed to the previous CR-V offering the K20A.

=== Facelift ===
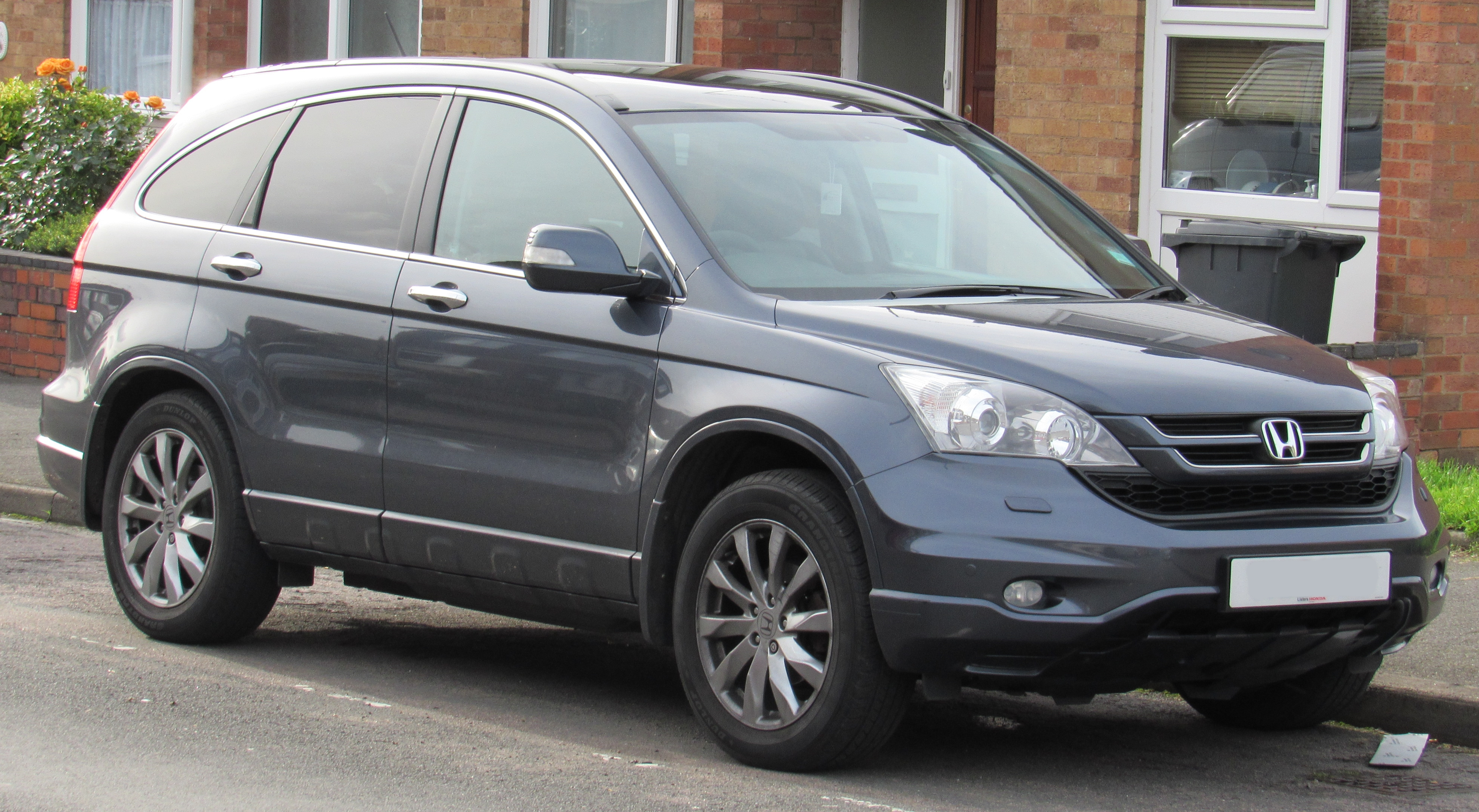
Third-generation CR-V (facelift)

In 2009 for the 2010 model year in North America, the CR-V received design, powertrain, and equipment changes. Changes included a redesigned front fascia with a new horizontal-slat chrome grille and honeycomb-designed lower front grille, new front bumper, and revised tail lights. The rear bumper was redesigned, as were the alloy wheels. The interior received minor changes, including seat fabrics, as well as wider driver and front-passenger armrests. The audio head unit controls were altered and the information display backlighting in the gauges was changed to blue, instead of the previous black.

=== Engine ===
Model name	Power	Capacity	Fuel	Year of construction
R20A2	149 HP	1,997 cc	Petrol	2009–present
K24Z1	160 HP	2,354 cc	Petrol	2006–present
K24A1	161 HP	2,354 cc	Petrol	2006–present
K24Z6	182 HP	2,354 cc	Petrol	2006–2012
N22A2	140 HP	2,204 cc	Diesel	2007–present
N22B3	150 HP	2,199 cc	Diesel	2007–present

== Fourth generation (2012) ==
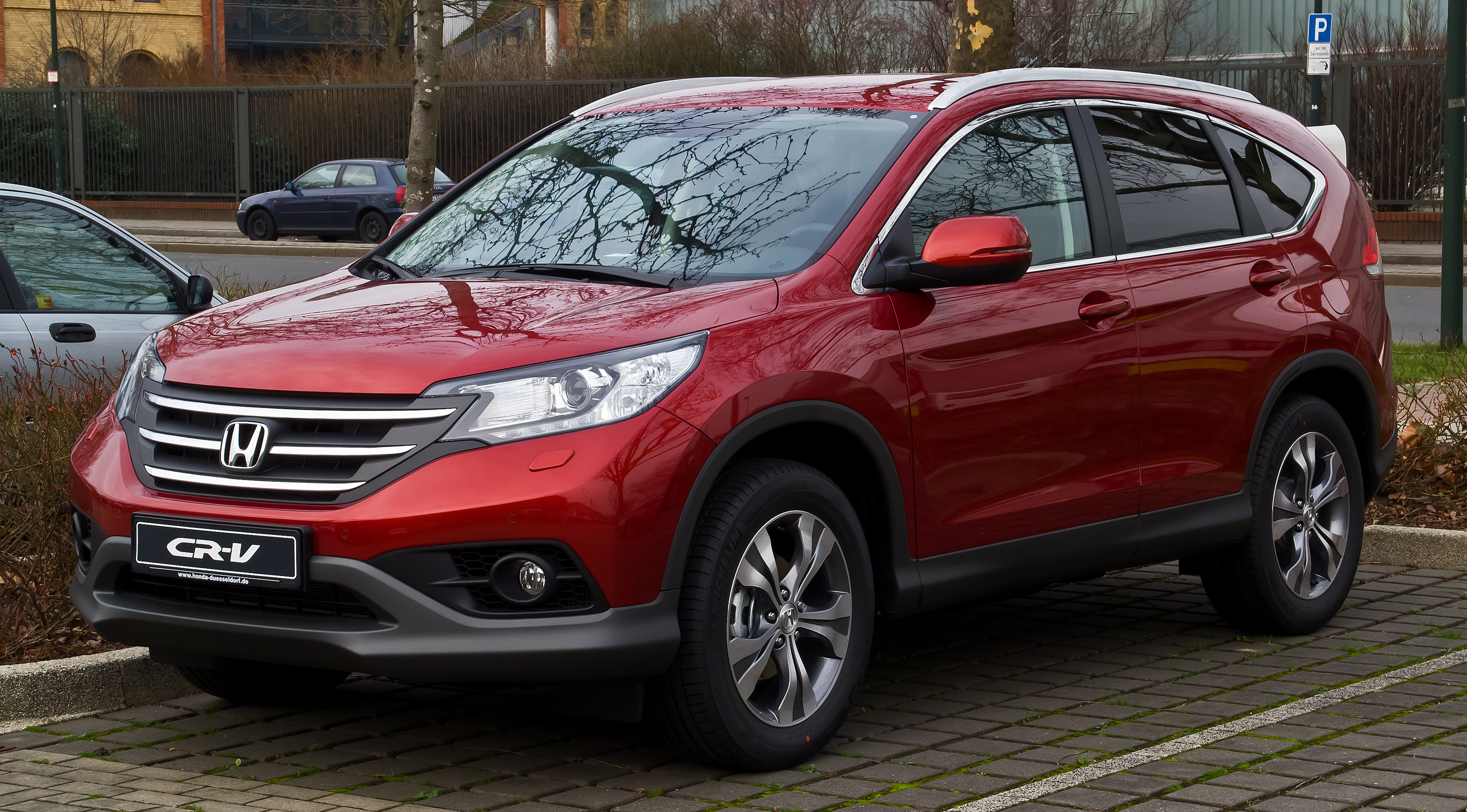
Fourth-generation CR-V (pre-facelift)

The fourth generation CR-V concept debuted at the Orange County International Auto Show in September 2011, the production 2012 CR-V debuted at the 2011 Los Angeles Auto Show. The CR-V went on sale in the U.S. on 15 December 2011.

It was powered by a 2.4-litre i-VTEC inline-four engine that put out 185 hp and 163 pound-feet (220 Nm) of torque at 4,400 rpm along with an all-new Real-Time all-wheel-drive (AWD) with intelligent control system. All North American CR-Vs came equipped with a 5-speed automatic transmission.

=== Facelift ===
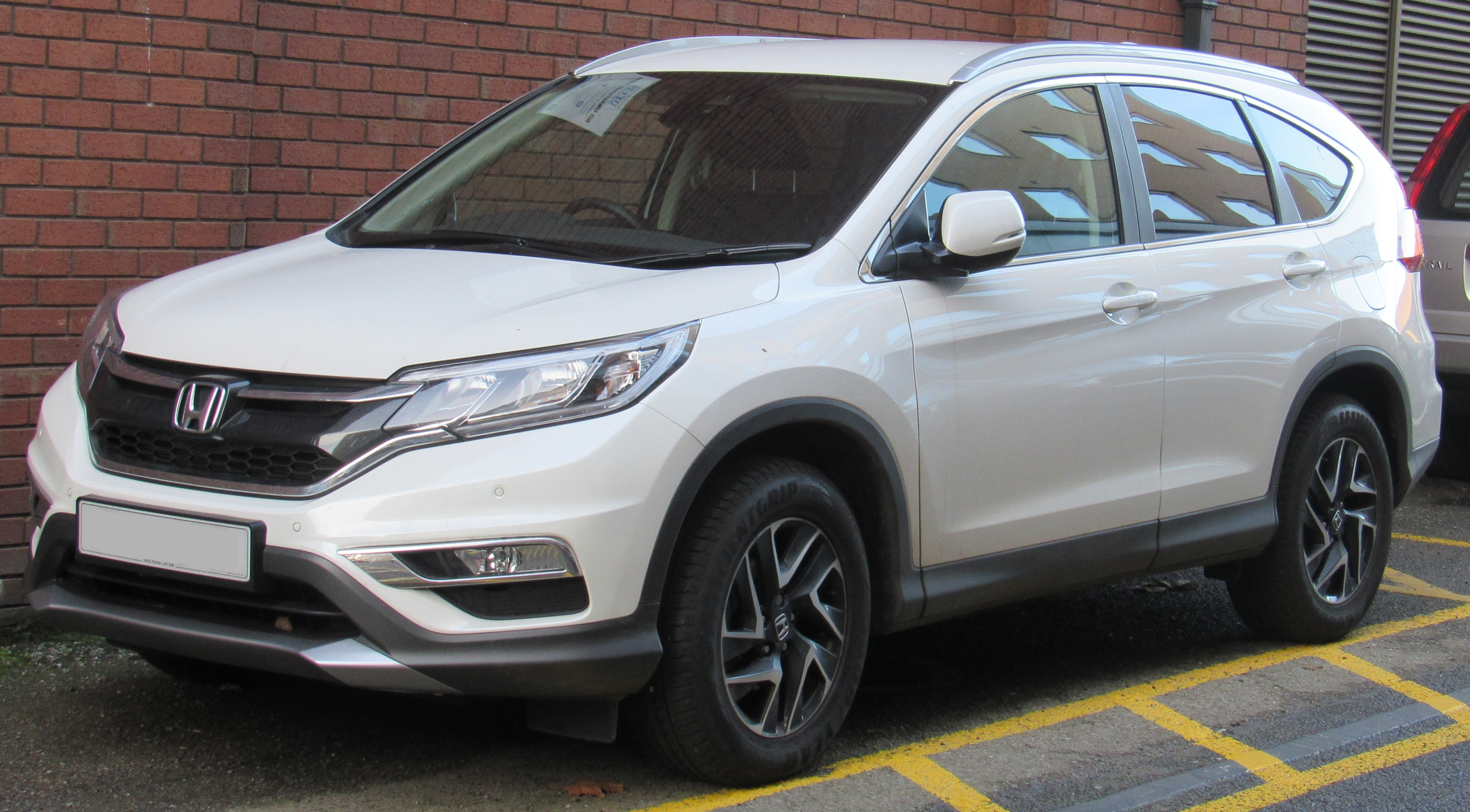
Fourth-generation CR-V (facelift)

The facelifted 2015 model year CR-V went on sale during October 2014. The Fourth generation CR-V used the direct injected Earth Dreams engine and continuously variable transmission (CVT) combination first introduced on the ninth generation Accord, EPA estimated fuel economy was improved +4/+3/+3 mpg (city/highway/combined). The structure was modified to improve crash performance, particularly in the IIHS's small offset crash test. The suspension shock absorbers, springs, anti-roll bars, and lower control arms were also revised to improve ride performance, while a reduced 15.6:1 steering gear ratio and larger brake booster gave it a sportier feel.

=== Engines ===
Model name	Power	Capacity	Fuel	Year of construction
R20A	150 HP	1,997 cc	Petrol	2012–present
K24A	173 HP	2,354 cc	Petrol	2012–present
K24Z6	180 HP	2,354 cc	Petrol	2013–present
K24W9	188 HP	2,354 cc	Petrol	2012–present
N16A1	120 HP	1,597 cc	Diesel	2013–present
N22B4	150 HP	2,199 cc	Diesel	2012–present

== Fifth generation (2017) ==
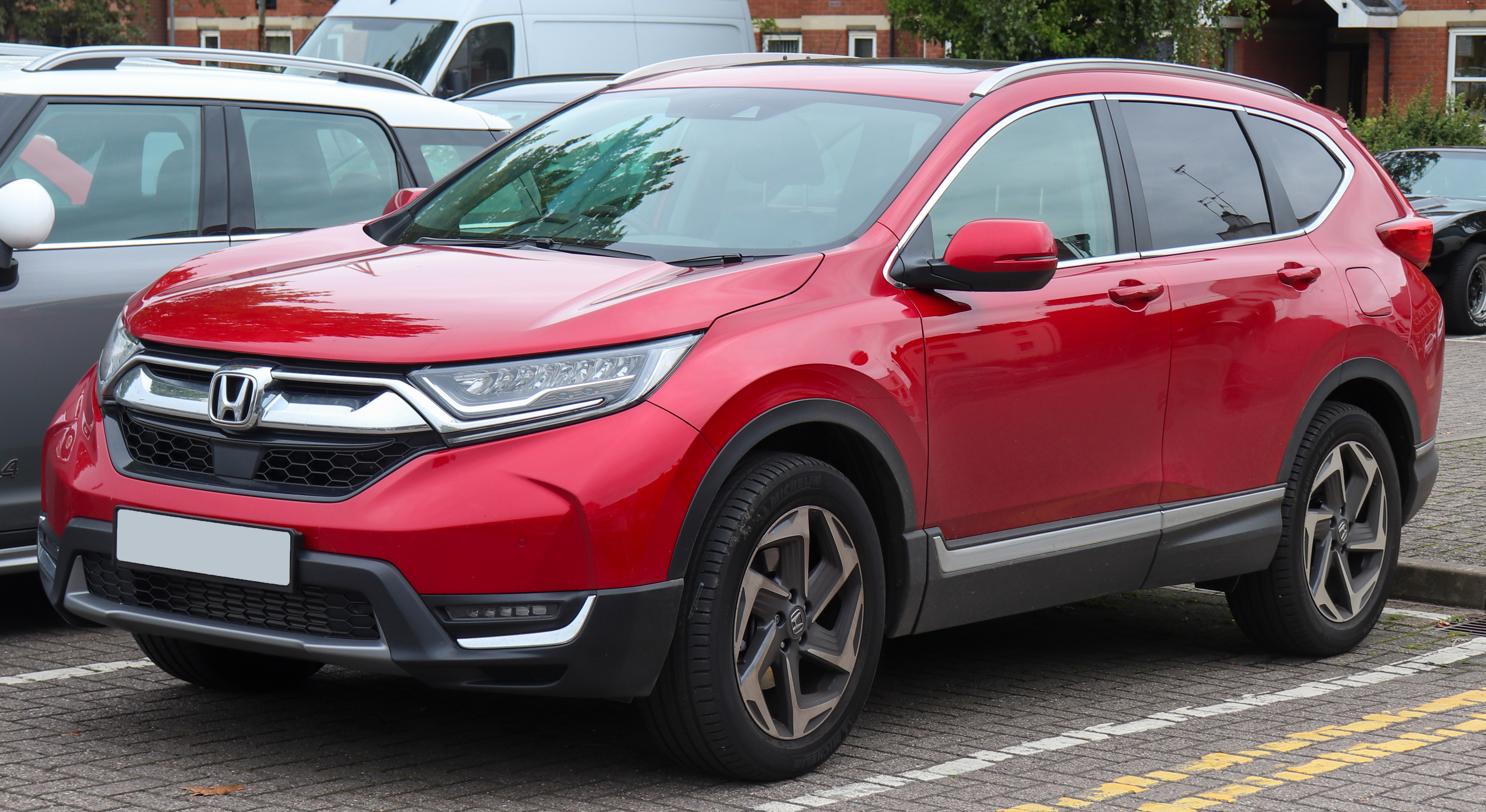
Fifth-generation CR-V (pre-facelift)

The fifth generation CR-V was unveiled on 13 October 2016 in Detroit. Sales began in the U.S. on 21 December 2016 as a 2017 model year. It used the same Honda compact global platform introduced on the tenth generation Civic. Honda began producing the CR-V at East Liberty, Ohio, (ELP) in November 2016 and at Greensburg, Indiana, (HMIN) during February 2017. It was available with an optional 7-seater variant in markets other than North America.

In October 2019, Guangqi Honda in China began marketing the model with a different styling as the Honda Breeze (Chinese: 皓影; pinyin: Hàoyǐng), which was sold alongside the international facelift version CR-V produced by Dongfeng Honda.

=== Facelift ===
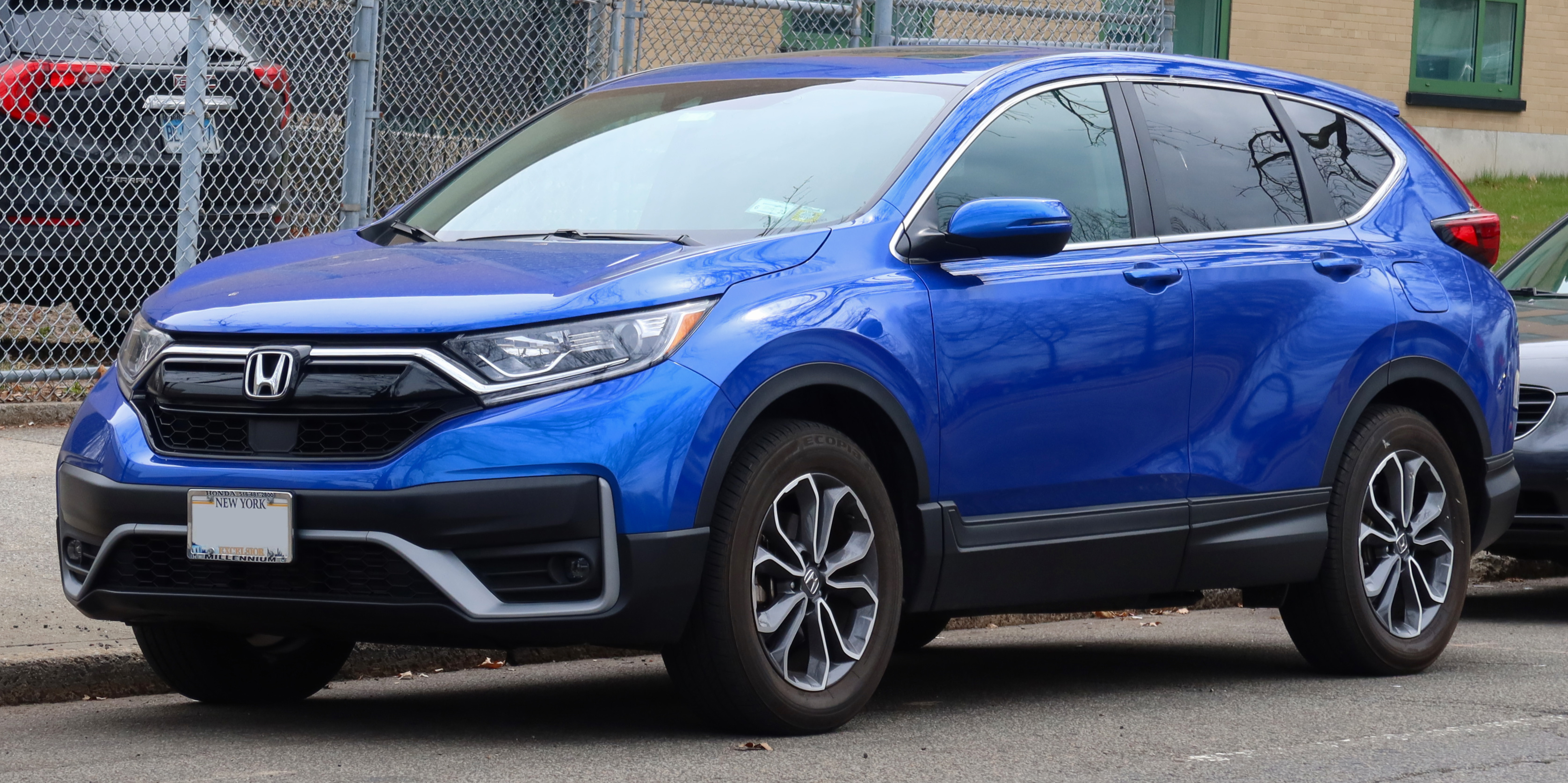
Fifth-generation CR-V (facelift)

Honda unveiled a refreshed CR-V in September 2019 for the 2020 model year, initially for the North American market. For the first time in North America, the refreshed model introduced a hybrid powertrain as an option. Additionally, the CR-V's suite of advanced safety features were standard on every trim level, meaning even the most affordable CR-V provided adaptive cruise control and the latest crash prevention technology.

== Sixth generation (2023) ==
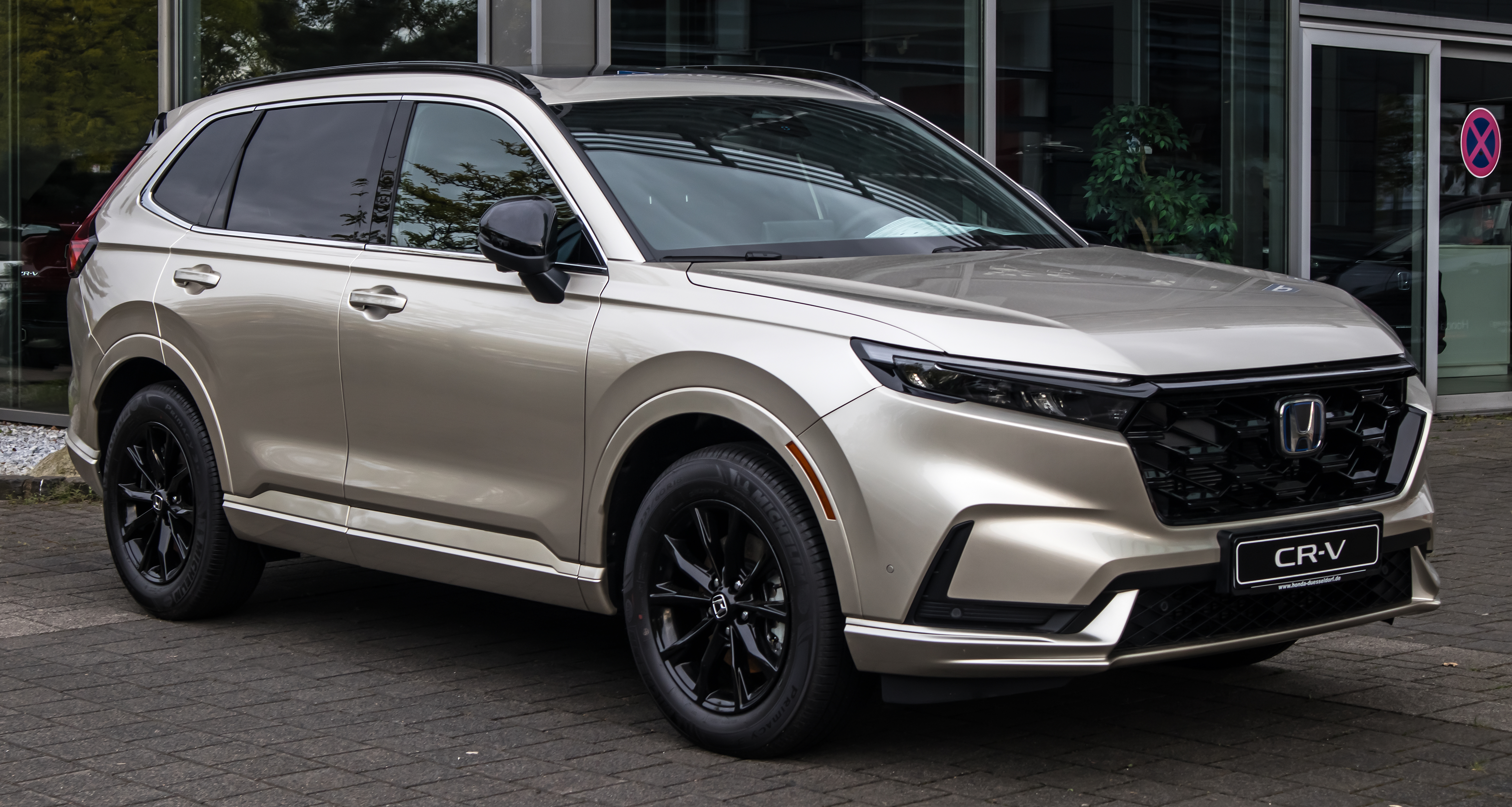
Sixth-generation CR-V e:PHEV

The sixth-generation CR-V was unveiled on 12 July 2022 in Los Angeles, California, with sales commencing in the U.S. in September 2022 as a 2023 model year. It was based on the Honda Architecture platform that underpinned the eleventh-generation Civic. The CR-V was available with 5- and 7-seater configurations, which varied by market.

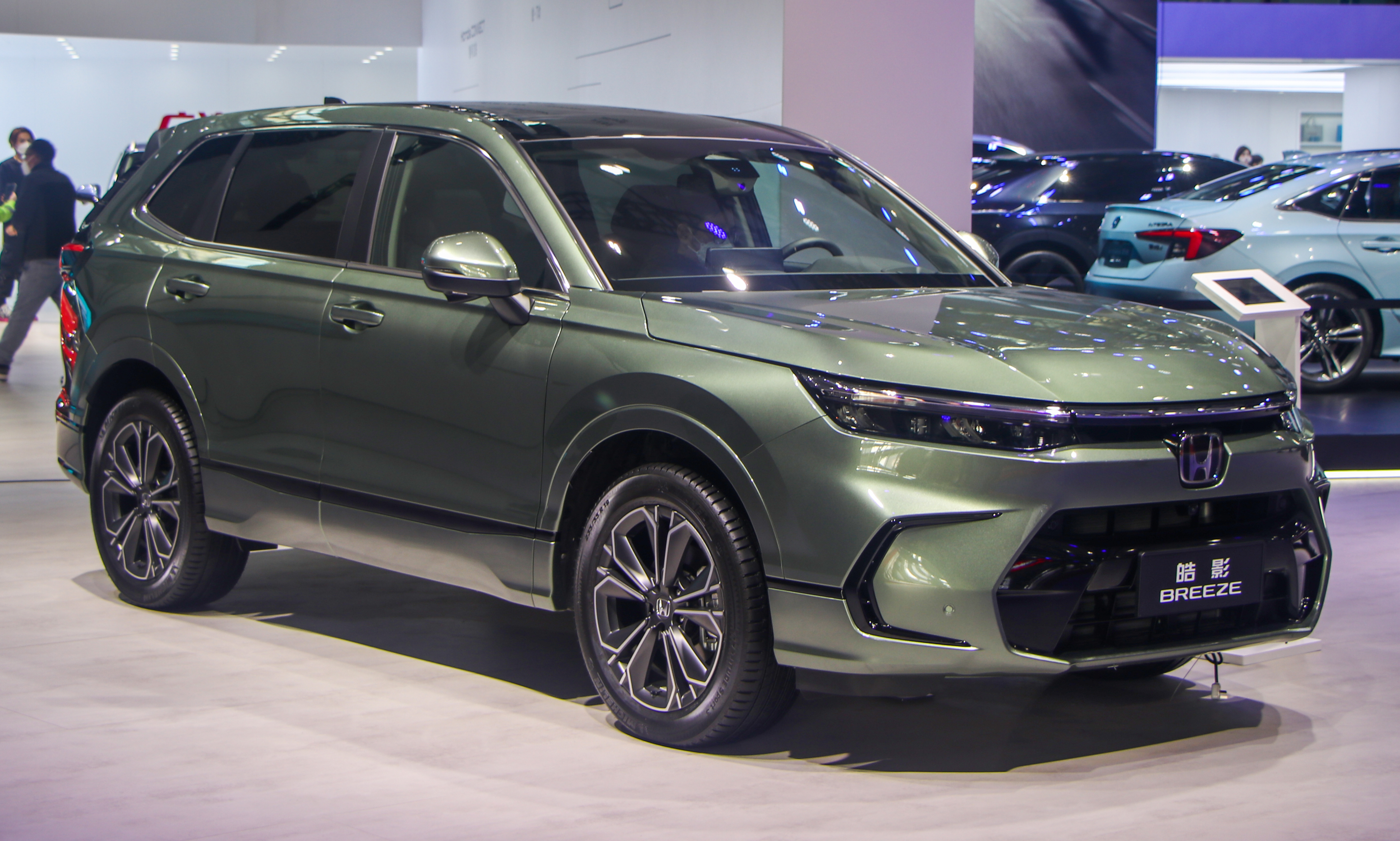
Second-generation Breeze

GAC Honda in China marketed the model as the Honda Breeze (Chinese: 本田皓影; pinyin: běntián hàoyǐng) in December 2022, which featured different front and rear fascias. The plant that produces the sixth-generation CR-V for Dongfeng Honda was responsible for the export of CR-V models sold in Europe, which commenced in June 2023.

== Seventh generation (2028) ==
Seventh generation

Overview
- Production: 2027 (to commence)
- Model years: 2028
- Assembly: United States: East Liberty, Ohio (ELAP); Greensburg, Indiana (HMIN); Canada: Alliston, Ontario (HCM)

Powertrain
- Engine: Petrol hybrid
- Hybrid drivetrain: Power-split

The seventh-generation CR-V will be launched in 2027 for 2028 model year with standard hybrid powertrain.

== Sales ==
Honda CR-V overtook Ford F-series pickup and Toyota RAV4 to be the best selling vehicle in the US in the first half of 2026.

US Sales of Honda CR-V
Calendar year	Sales
1997	66,752
1998	100,582
1999	120,754
2000	118,260
2001	118,313
2002	146,266
2003	143,909
2004	149,281
2005	150,219
2006	170,028
2007	219,160
2008	197,279
2009	191,214
2010	203,714
2011	218,373
2012	281,652
2013	303,904
2014	335,019
2015	345,647
2016	357,335
2017	377,895
2018	379,013
2019	384,168
2020	333,502
2021	361,271
2022	238,155
2023	361,457
2024	402,791
2025	403,768

=== Other markets ===
Year	Canada	Europe	China				Thailand	Indonesia		Philippines	Vietnam	Australia	Mexico	Malaysia (Note: Figures based on registration (Malaysia))	Brazil
Year	Canada	Europe	CR-V	e:PHEV	Breeze	e:PHEV	Thailand	CR-V	e:HEV	Philippines	Vietnam	Australia	Mexico	Malaysia	Brazil
1997		16,022													
1998		37,975										8,161			
1999		34,793										9,735			
2000		29,129						1,234				12,866			3,620
2001		23,373						4,854				8,665			3,916
2002		30,854						5,227				12,449	5,677		5,162
2003		31,443						10,130				9,736	7,429		3,968
2004		33,029	9,301					6,701				8,773	10,059		2,247
2005	15,976	49,739	26,243					7,694				8,844	11,220		2,217
2006	17,821	43,258	23,672					1,864				10,069	14,084		1,232
2007	20,980	76,613	45,688					15,750				12,642	16,995		5,357
2008	20,500	55,107	80,607					17,800				9,812	16,929		4,320
2009	18,554	42,437	102,745					10,110				5,103	11,211	3,496	11,238
2010	24,930	38,781	140,000					16,961				7,244	11,750	5,552	18,746
2011	25,076	36,088	160,003					11,760				5,748	10,346	4,116	16,284
2012	33,339	37,182	169,037					14,753				4,733	24,723	2,553	14,894
2013	34,481	47,596	199,333					20,385				12,510	24,021	8,677	8,272
2014	37,684	49,182	168,184				8,393	8,551			2,918		25,216	6,987	6,935
2015	38,961	46,967	156,608				7,802	10,750			4,533		21,798	8,243	1,959
2016	44,789	43,456	180,319				3,487	7,853			4,010		19,161	5,692	1,939
2017	50,443	34,616	181,177				11,232	15,905			3,522		27,761	8,817	634
2018	54,879	28,576	143,689				11,672	14,565			8,819		24,332	13,856	514
2019	55,859	32,929	213,306		9,007		10,933	10,395		2,457	9,564	13,810	19,069	12,091	930
2020	44,495	20,239	249,983		156,306		5,374	4,979		931	11,365	9,523	11,877	6,016	390
2021	50,935	17,312	213,791		166,284		5,327	8,972		1,058	5,854	6,875	11,537	7,487	420
2022	32,096	14,652	231,857		133,441		2,127	7,647			9,578		9,902	10,124	77
2023	52,146		206,241	8,837	119,838	4,656	10,859	3,250 (Note: The number is combined with the fifth-generation Honda CR-V.)	1,527	1,178	5,758	7,808	12,405	8,111	4
2024			174,483	4,176	123,675	2,667	8,420	990	2,373		6,688	5,547	11,988	11,357	
2025			170,940	187	118,091	2,492	1,163	330	150			5,595	11,103	10,735	
