= Moke (2013) =

Chinese recreation of the original 1960s Mini Moke

MOKE
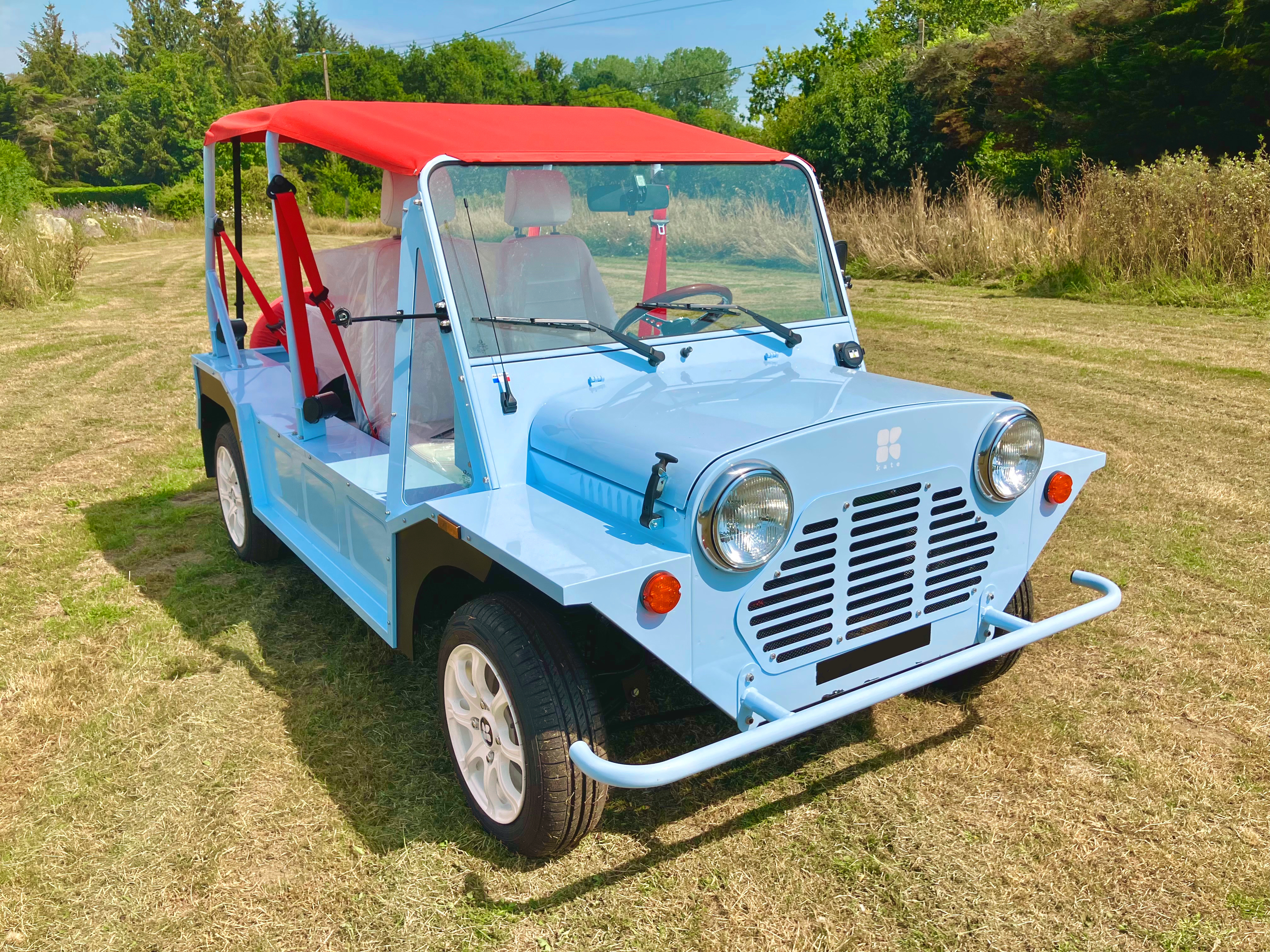
- Moke by Kate, France (2024)

Overview
- Manufacturer: Chery; Cruise Car Inc.; Moke International (Note: Subsidiary of EV Technology Group (EVTG)); Nosmoke SAS
- Also called: eMoke; Nosmoke; Moke Californian
- Production: 2013–present
- Assembly: China: Wuhu, Anhui (Chery); France: Cerizay (Nosmoke SAS); United Kingdom: Northampton (Fablink); United Kingdom: Leamington Spa (Moke International Ltd); United States: Sarasota (Cruise Car Inc.)
- Designer: Michael Young; Ben McCarthy

Body and chassis
- Class: Recreational vehicle; Neighborhood Electric Vehicle
- Body style: 4-seat convertible
- Layout: Front-engine, front-wheel-drive
- Related: Mini Moke

Powertrain
- Engine: 1,083 cc SQR472F I4
- Transmission: 5-speed manual

Dimensions
- Wheelbase: 2,260 mm (89.0 in)
- Length: 3,460 mm (136.2 in)
- Width: 1,530 mm (60.2 in)
- Height: 1,540 mm (60.6 in)
- Kerb weight: 820 kg (1,810 lb) (petrol); 1,050–1,140 kg (2,310–2,510 lb) (electric)

The Moke (MOKE) is a Chinese recreation of the original 1960s Mini Moke. It has been manufactured in China by Chery Automobile since 2013, with final assembly carried out by various companies in the United States, United Kingdom, and France. The name "Mini Moke" combines Mini with Moke, an archaic term for donkey. The rights to the "Moke" name are the subject of ongoing trademark disputes, although the car is now simply called "MOKE" (stylized in all caps), with BMW retaining the rights to "Mini".

The original Mini Moke was initially conceived and manufactured as a lightweight military vehicle by British Motor Corporation (BMC), and subsequently marketed for civilian use by that company's various successor companies and subsidiaries. It was known for its simple, straightforward, doorless design, and for its adaptability. While the original design was intended for utility purposes, the new MOKE is mainly meant for recreational use, as a beach car, or as a neighborhood vehicle.

The MOKE revival was designed by Chinese automaker Chery Automobile, although ownership of the "Moke" trademark is disputed. Moke America LLC distributes the vehicle in the United States, while British production by Moke International Ltd. restarted in 2018 (this company was subsequently acquired by EV Technology Group in 2022 and since then the Moke brand has become EV only).

== History ==
The original Mini Moke was designed by Sir Alec Issigonis and John Sheppard. The more rugged Mini Moke was an attempt to take a portion of the military vehicle business from Land Rover, but poor ground clearance and a low-powered engine did not meet the most basic requirements for an off-road vehicle.

The Mini Moke entered production nonetheless, as a utility and recreational convertible for private use under the Austin, Morris and Leyland brands. The Mini Moke was built in Australia from 1966 until 1981, and was then gradually moved to British Leyland's Portuguese subsidiary beginning in 1980. Italian motorcycle manufacturers Cagiva took over the rights to the Portuguese operation in 1990 and built the Moke there (styled "MOKE" without "Mini" in the name) in small numbers until 1993.

Other companies have built replicas and recreations over the years; the car's simple design has also allowed enthusiasts to create entire new Mokes from parts.

== Revival ==
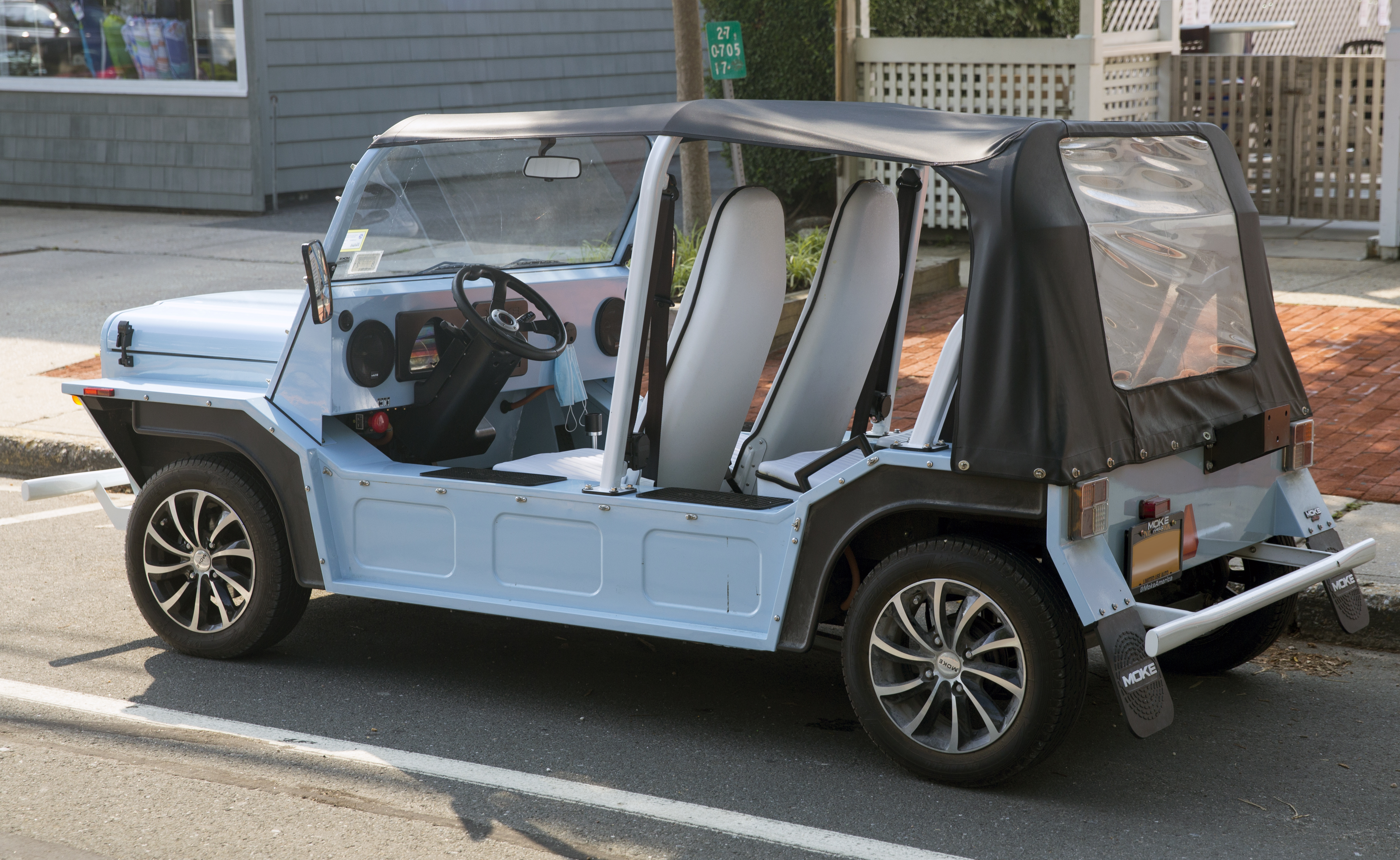
Rear side view of 2019 eMoke (USA)

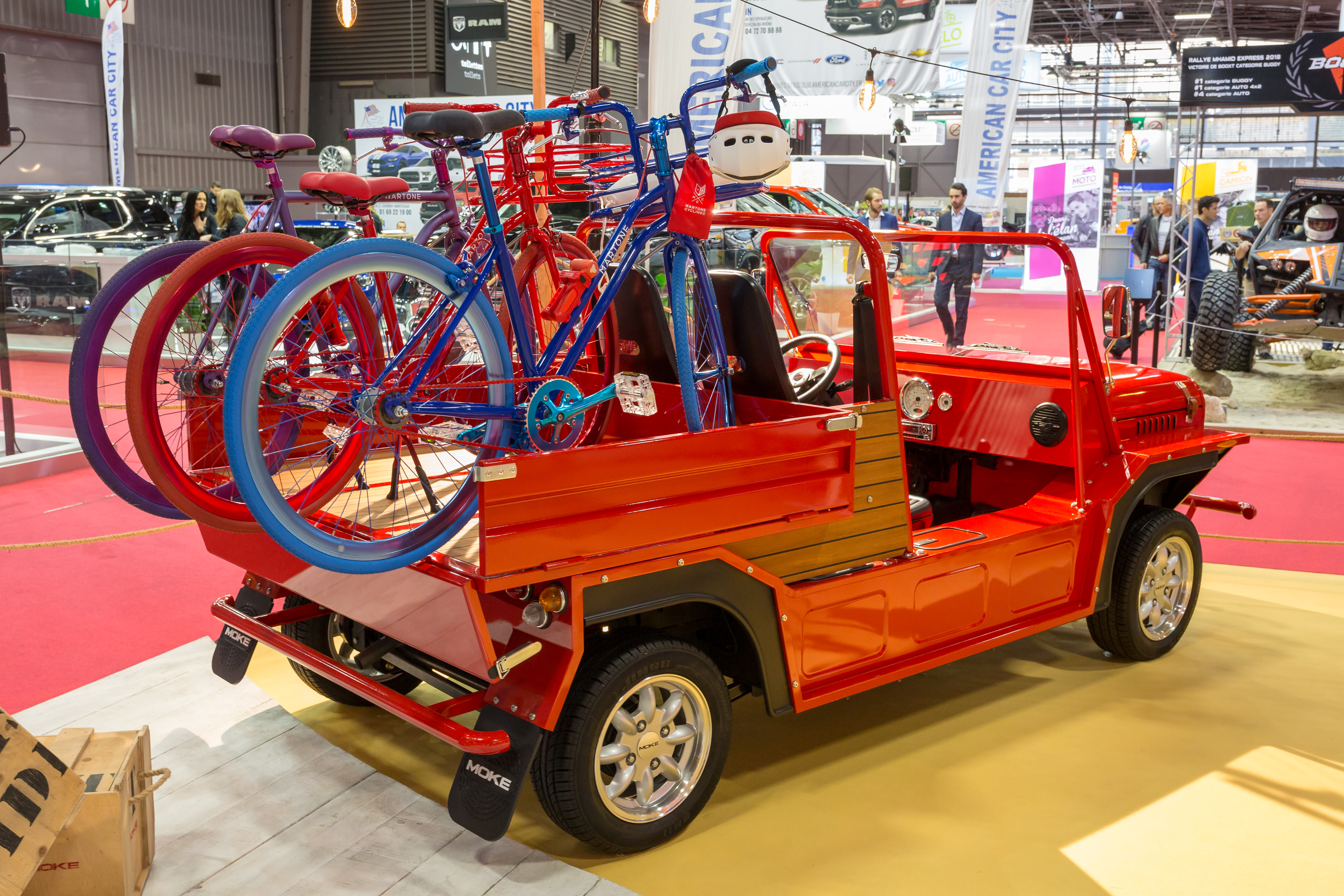
MOKE special at the 2018 Paris Motor Show

Chery Automobile began manufacturing the Moke in 2013 from China. This evocation of the classic Mini Moke built from 1964 until 1993 was designed by industrial designer Michael Young and is sold by several companies in the United Kingdom, France, and the United States. These local assemblers also use locally sourced parts like glass, tires, and electrical engines to various degrees.

The last petrol powered Moke of this design was sold at the Blenheim Palace Ball auction in 2022. The proceeds of the event were donated to the charity Starlight UK.

Since 2022 the Moke brand is EV only except for the Chinese market where locally built cars still use petrol engines.

=== Electric versions ===
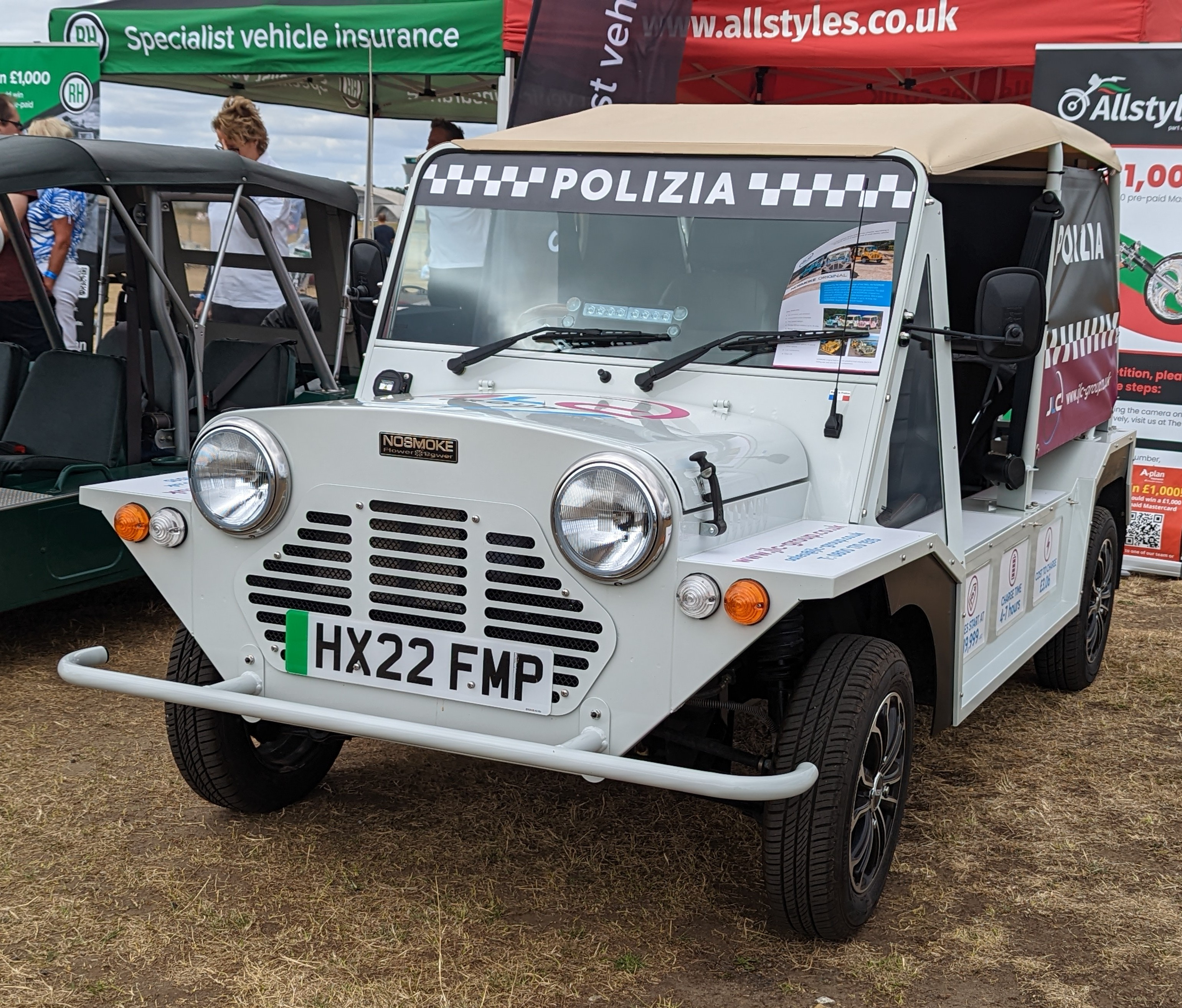
2022 Nosmoke Original

Since 2014, an electric version based on the original Moke design was assembled in France under the name "Nosmoke". Built by a company called Nosmoke S.A.S., they originally operated out of the old Heuliez plant in Cerizay but later relocated to an old printing plant in the same town. Nosmoke has also developed a 2-seater box truck version with a closed cabin called the Truckï, which is set to enter production in 2023. An Electric Moke (styled "eMoke") low-speed vehicle based on the Chinese MOKE has been assembled in the United States by Cruise Car Inc. for MOKE America since 2017. It uses a mix of Chinese-made and locally sourced parts. An electric E-Moke built in France was also offered for a few years, but production moved to Britain in 2021. In 2021, a second electric version based on this design was launched, with a limited-edition US highway certified version called "MOKE Californian" following in 2022.

In 2022, Moke International agreed to a takeover by EV Technology Group (EVTG). The Canadian electric transportation company bought 67 percent of the shares, with an option to increase this to full ownership. In a related purchase, EV Technology Group also purchased 76 percent of Fablink, which manufactures the e-Moke electric vehicle, with an option to acquire the remainder of the company.

The current electric version is assembled at the company's UK factory in Leamington Spa, where "its production targets exceed 500 units" in 2025.

== Design ==
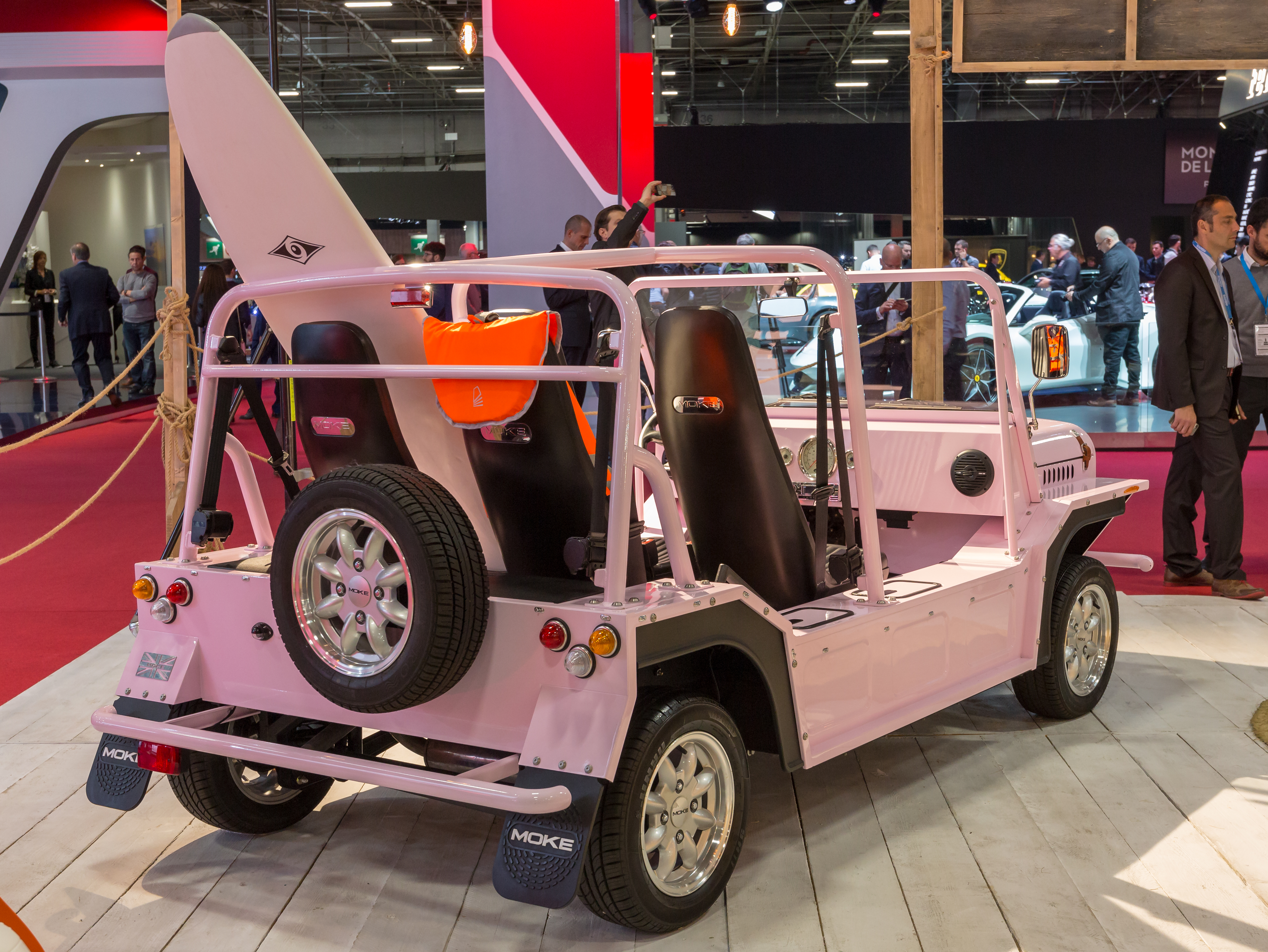
Another MOKE at the 2018 Paris Motor Show

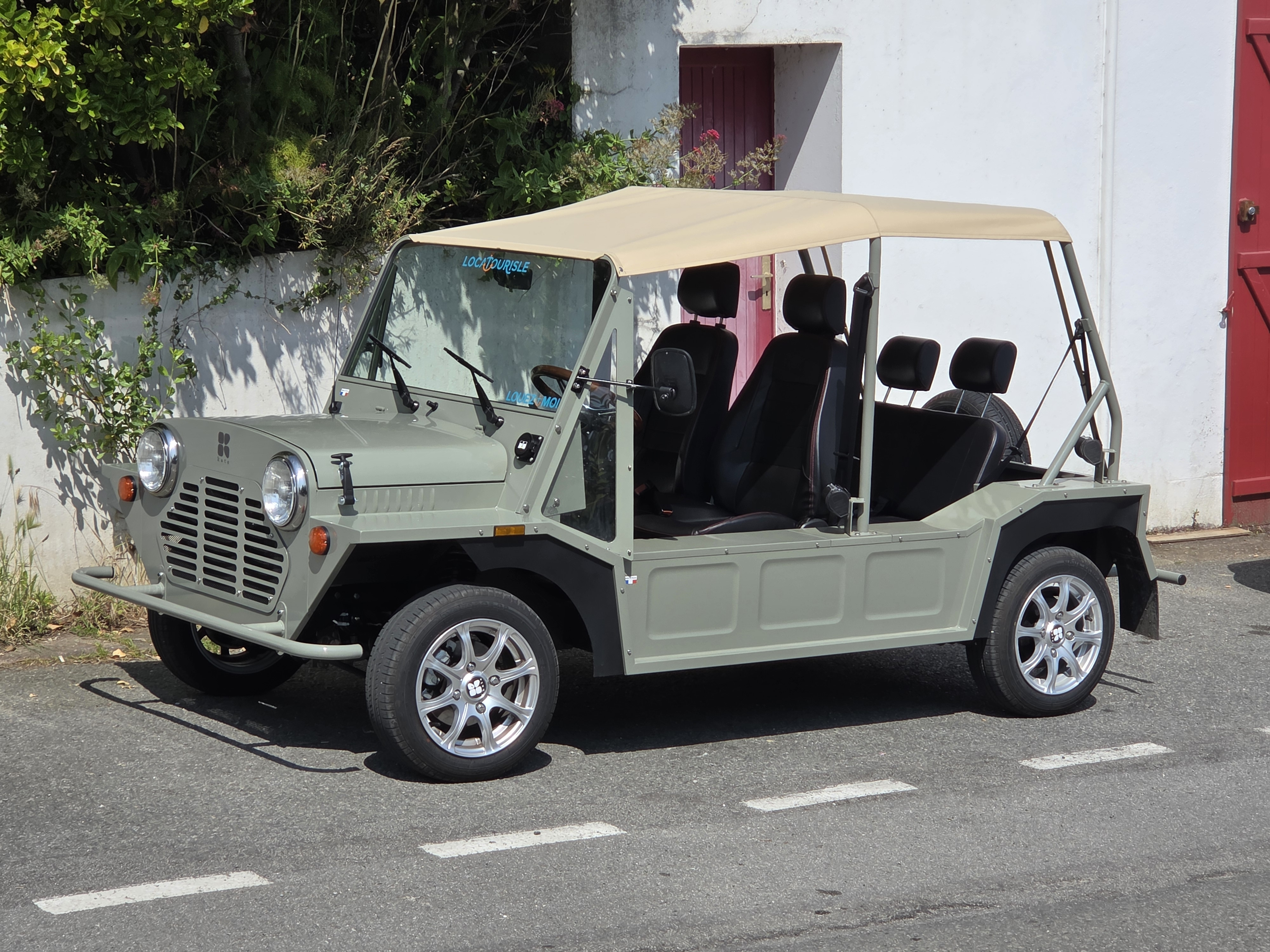
Kate Moke electric rental car, Belle-Île-en-Mer, France (2025)

The MOKE has a front subframe and other mechanical items such as the front strut suspension and transmission adapted from Chery's other cars. The engine is a 1.1-liter, 50 kW (68 hp) four-cylinder unit built by Chery subsidiary Acteco Powertrain and commonly seen across a wide range of Chinese-built compacts and subcompacts. The Chinese drivetrain has necessitated a larger front end with a much more substantial front overhang than the original Mini Moke's Alec Issigonis design allowed.

Aside from the petrol-powered version, numerous electric versions have also been developed by local assemblers. These engines offer a variety of outputs, with some models being certified for highway use while some are only sold as low-speed vehicles (LSV), limited to a top speed of 40 km/h (25 mph).
