= Mini Moke =

British light utility vehicle (1963–1993)

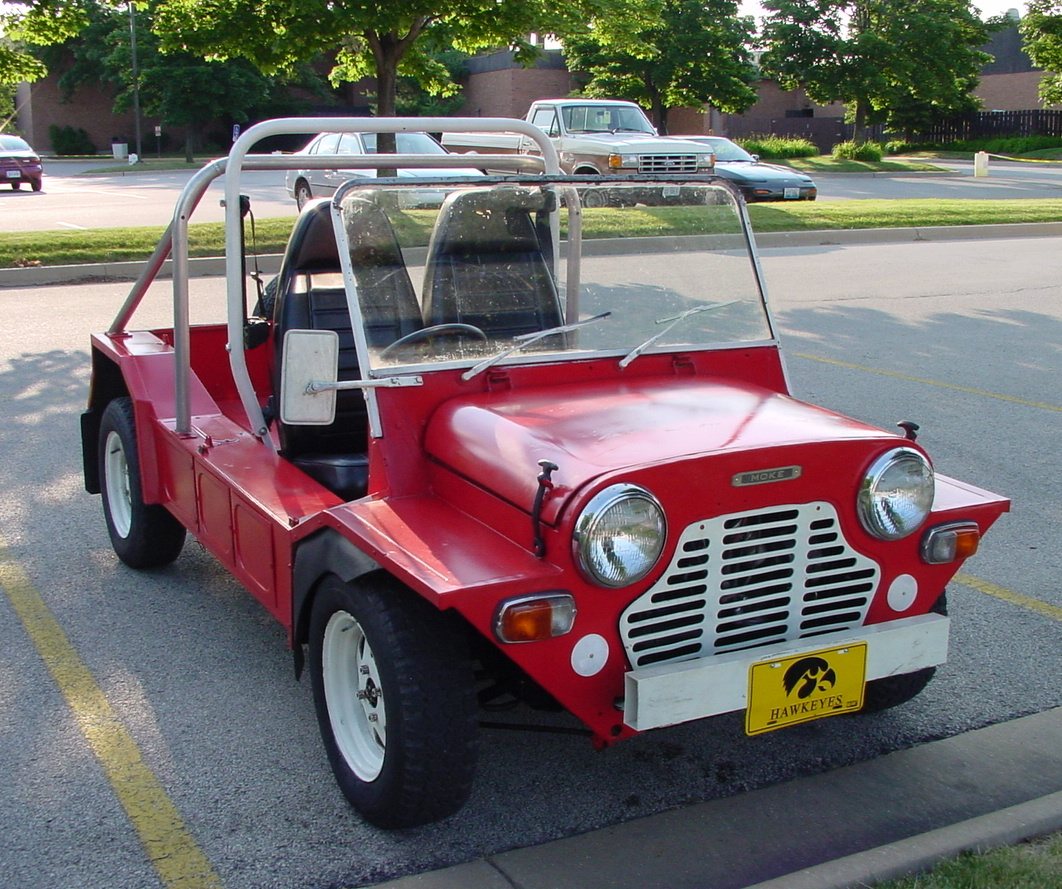

Overview
- Manufacturer: BMC (1964–1968); Leyland Australia (1966–1981); British Leyland Portugal (1980–1989); Cagiva (1990–1993)
- Also called: Austin Mini Moke; Morris Mini Moke; BMC Mini Moke (military version); Leyland Moke (Australia)
- Production: 1964–1993
- Assembly: United Kingdom: Longbridge, Birmingham (Longbridge plant); Portugal: Vendas Novas; Portugal: Setúbal; Australia: Zetland, New South Wales; Malaysia: Alor Setar; Rhodesia: Umtali; South Africa: Cape Town
- Designer: Sir Alec Issigonis; John Sheppard

Body and chassis
- Class: Utility vehicle
- Body style: 4-seat convertible; 2-seat pickup
- Layout: FF layout
- Related: Moke (2013)

Powertrain
- Engine: 848 cc A-series I4; 998 cc A-series I4; 1098 cc A-series I4; 1275 cc A-series I4
- Transmission: 4-speed manual

Dimensions
- Wheelbase: 2,020 mm (79.5 in)
- Length: 3,050 mm (120.1 in)
- Width: 1,300 mm (51.2 in)
- Height: 1,400 mm (55.1 in) (with cloth roof and windshield raised)
- Kerb weight: 406 kg (895 lb) (early models); 578 kg (1,274 lb) (later models)

The Mini Moke is a small, front-wheel-drive utility and recreational convertible, conceived and manufactured as a lightweight military vehicle by British Motor Corporation (BMC), and subsequently marketed for civilian use under the Austin, Morris, Leyland, and Moke brands. The name "Mini Moke" combines mini with moke, an archaic term for a mule. The Moke is known for its simple, straightforward, doorless design and for its adaptability.

BMC's Cowley plant started building Mokes in January 1964, with 14,518 produced in the UK between 1964 and 1968; 26,000 were manufactured in Australia between 1966 and 1981; and 10,000 in Portugal between 1980 and 1993 when, after a nearly 30-year run, production ended.

In 2013 a new Chinese version appeared, made by Chinese automaker Chery Automobile started production in China of a new car called Moke. This evocation of the design is assembled and distributed by a number of companies in several countries including England, France, and the US, although ownership of the Moke trademark is disputed. This Moke is a full new design and shares nothing with the original British Mini Moke.

== History ==
The original Moke was designed by Sir Alec Issigonis and John Sheppard. When Issigonis designed the Mini, he planned another vehicle to share the Mini's mechanical parts, but with a more rugged body shell. This was an attempt to take a portion of the military vehicle business from Land Rover. Issigonis had previously designed the Nuffield Guppy in a failed attempt to break into that market. By 1959, BMC had working prototypes of what was codenamed "The Buckboard", later to become the Mini Moke. These prototypes were shown to the British Army as a parachute-droppable vehicle, but poor ground clearance and a low-powered engine did not meet the most basic requirements for an off-road vehicle. Only the Royal Navy showed any interest in the Buckboard, as a vehicle for use on the decks of aircraft carriers.

Early promotional material made much of the lightness of the vehicle, showing four soldiers travelling in the Moke off-road, then picking it up by its tubular bumpers and carrying it when (inevitably) its low ground-clearance proved inadequate.

In a further attempt to make a viable military vehicle, a few four-wheel drive Mokes were made. This was accomplished by the addition of a second engine and transmission at the back of the vehicle with linked clutches and gear shifters, which did nothing for the ground-clearance problems. This vehicle was called "The Twini" and was shown to the US Army—again with no success. The added mechanical complexity and lack of interest by the military discouraged development beyond the prototype stage.

Three of these vehicles were used by the Brazilian Army after being captured during the 1969 Rupununi Rebellion from Guyanese rebels, who had crossed the border into Brazil.

During the Rhodesian Bush War there was an attempt by the Rhodesian Security Forces to create an Armoured Moke as an improvised fighting vehicle, which was seemingly unsuccessful.

Originally prototyped using the engine, transmission and suspension parts from the Mini Van, the design's small wheels and low ground clearance made it unsuitable as an off-road military vehicle. The design was subsequently adapted and sold globally for general use as a low-cost, easily maintained, lightweight recreational and utility vehicle.

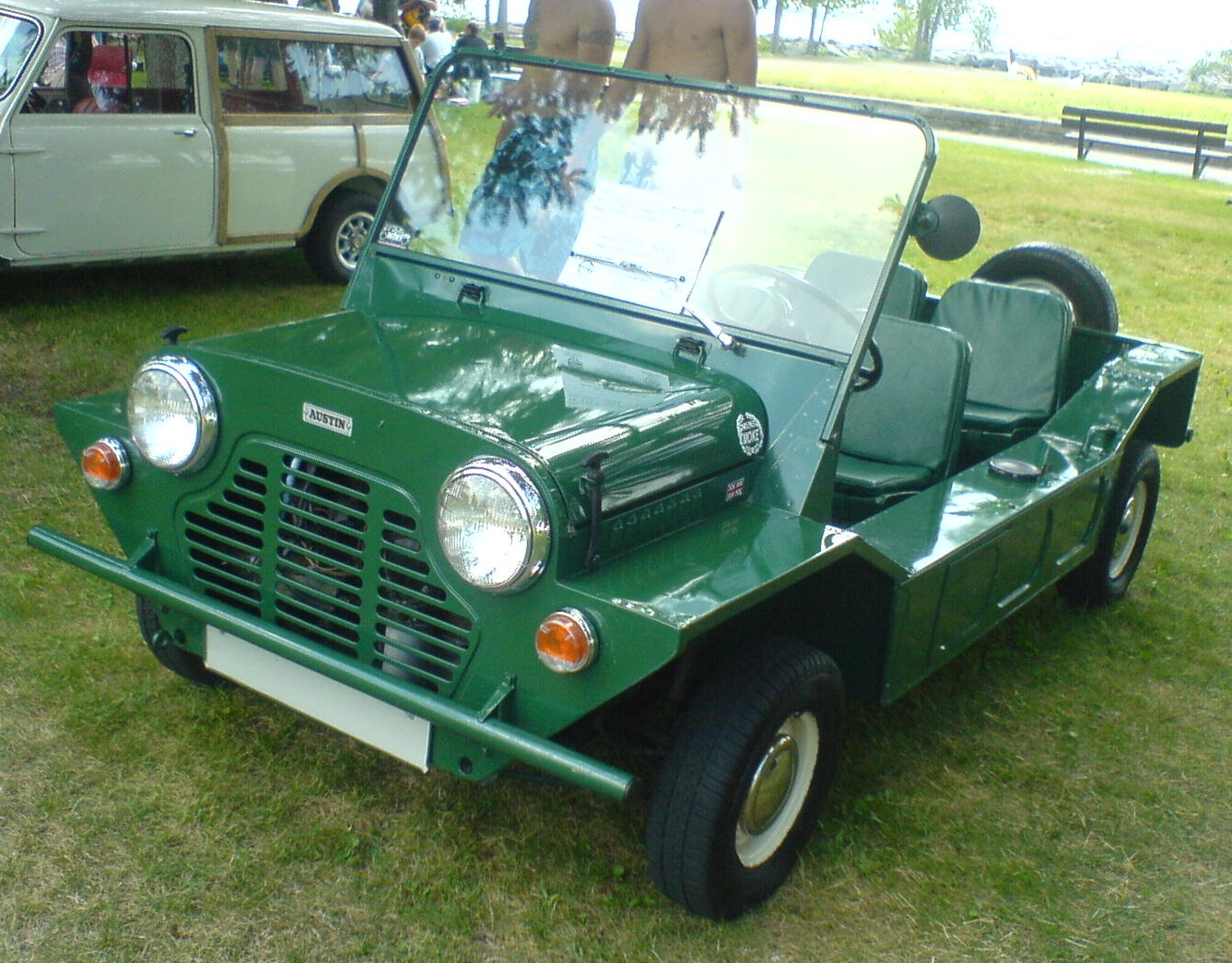
1965 Austin Mini Moke BMC UK for the North American market

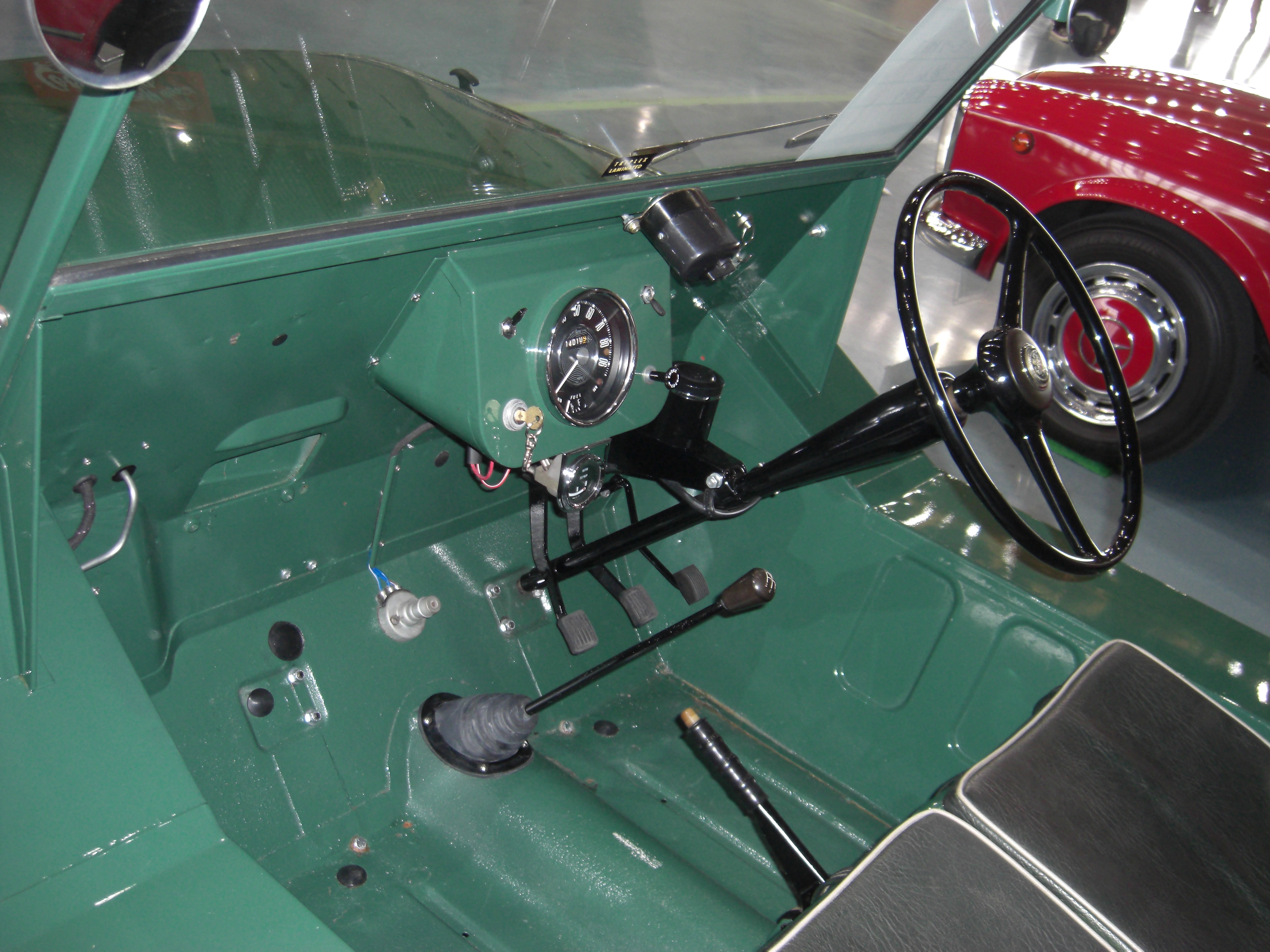
Austin Mini Moke interior

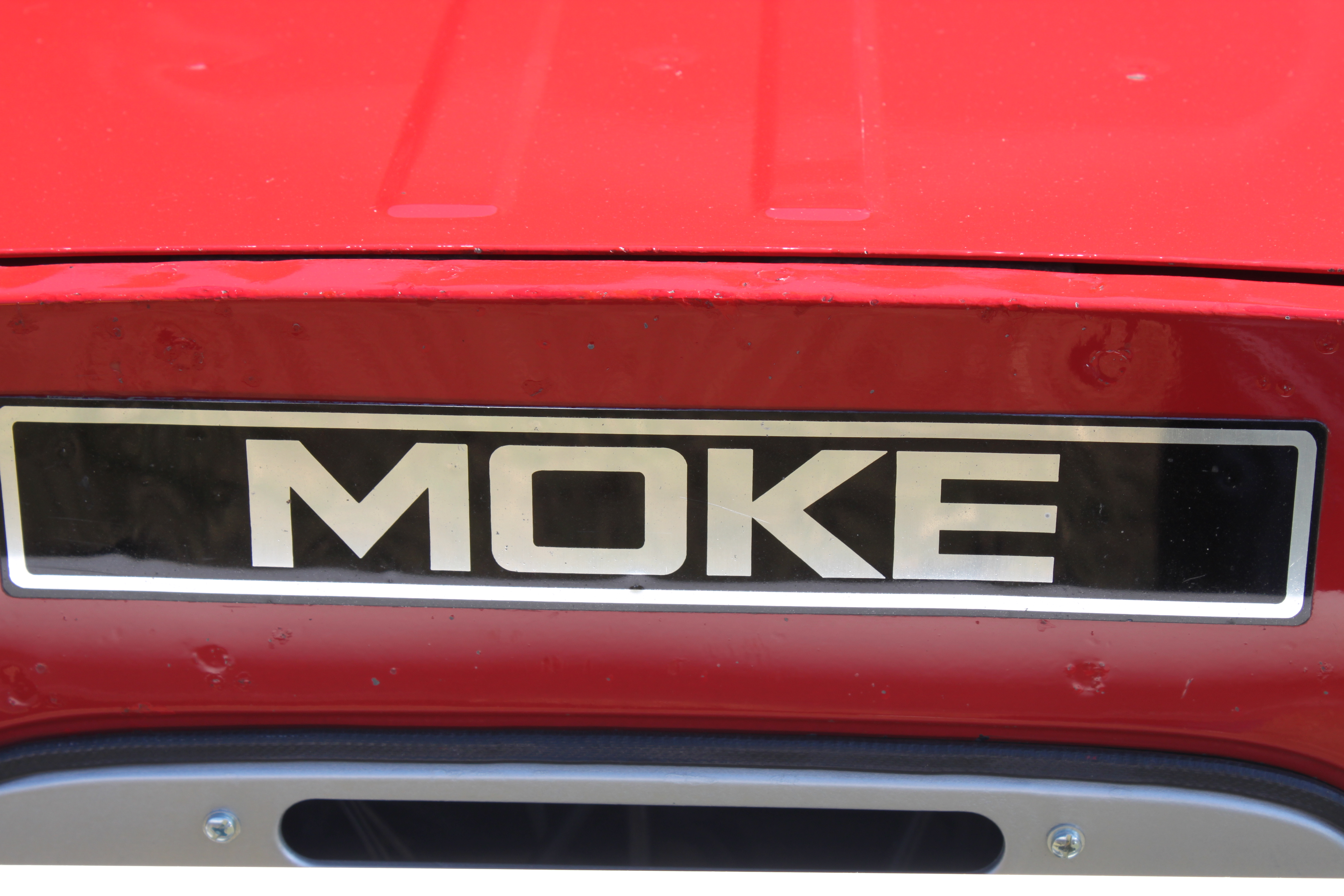
"MOKE" Logo

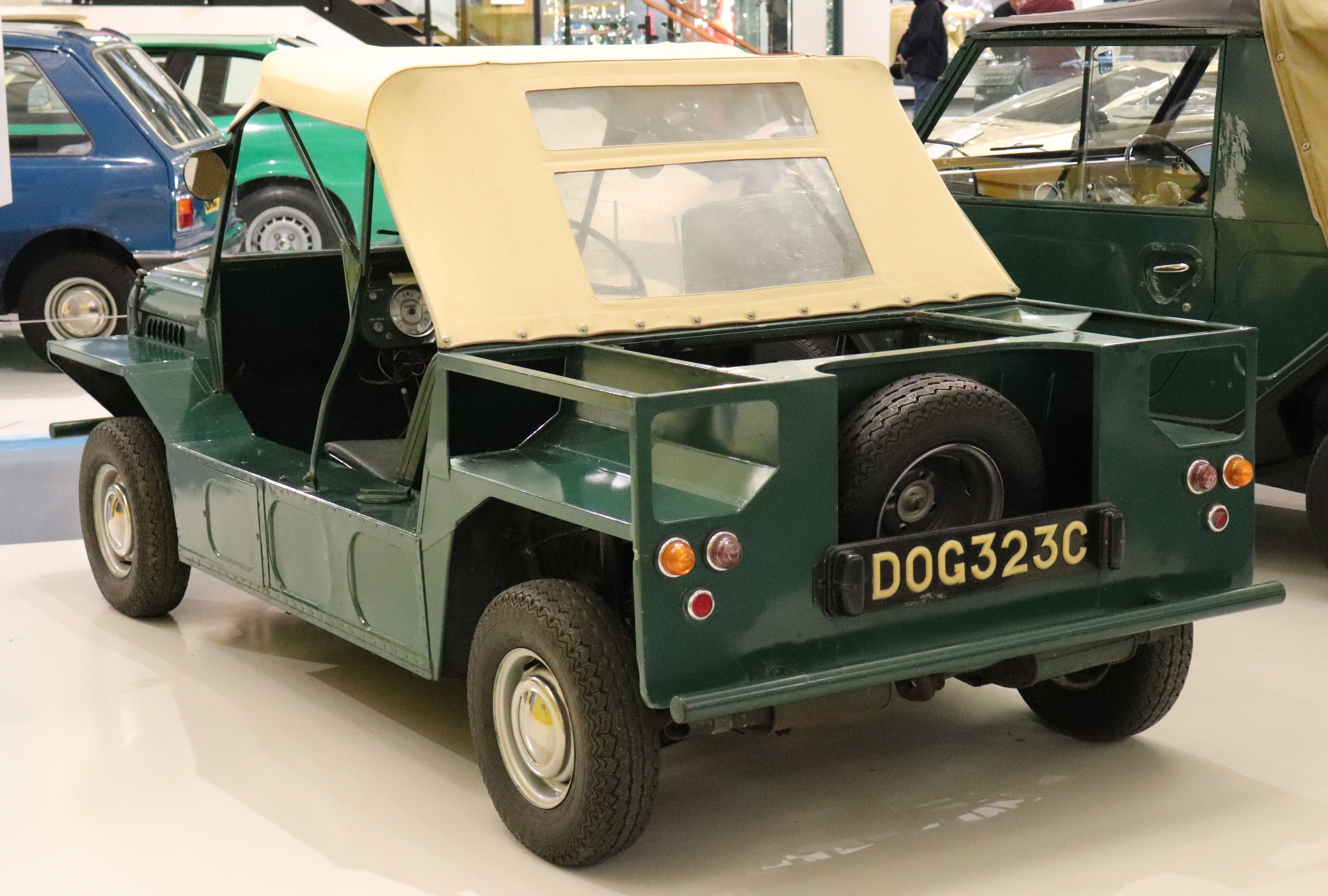
1962 Austin Mini "Twini" Moke 850cc

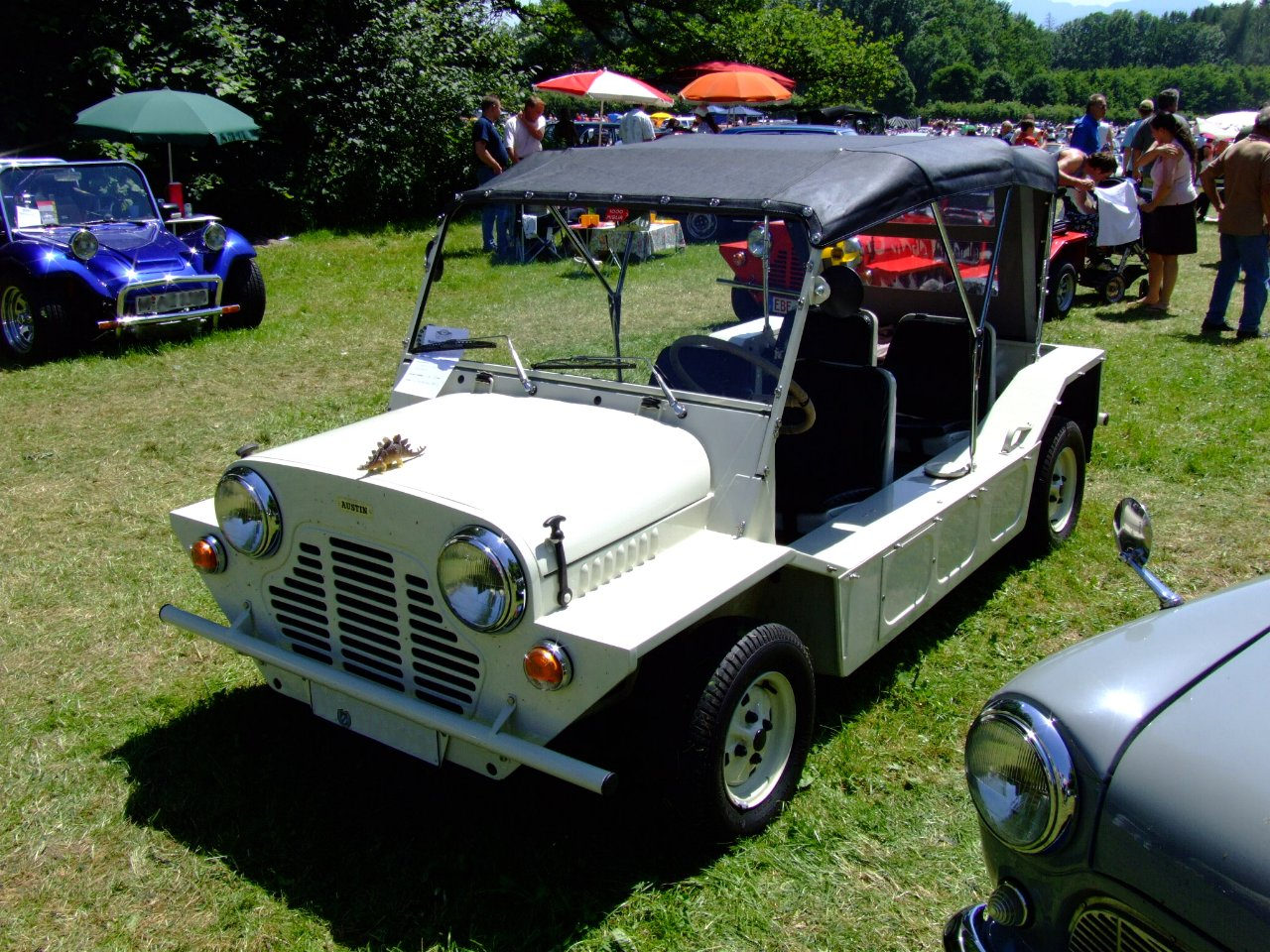
1967 Austin Mini Moke

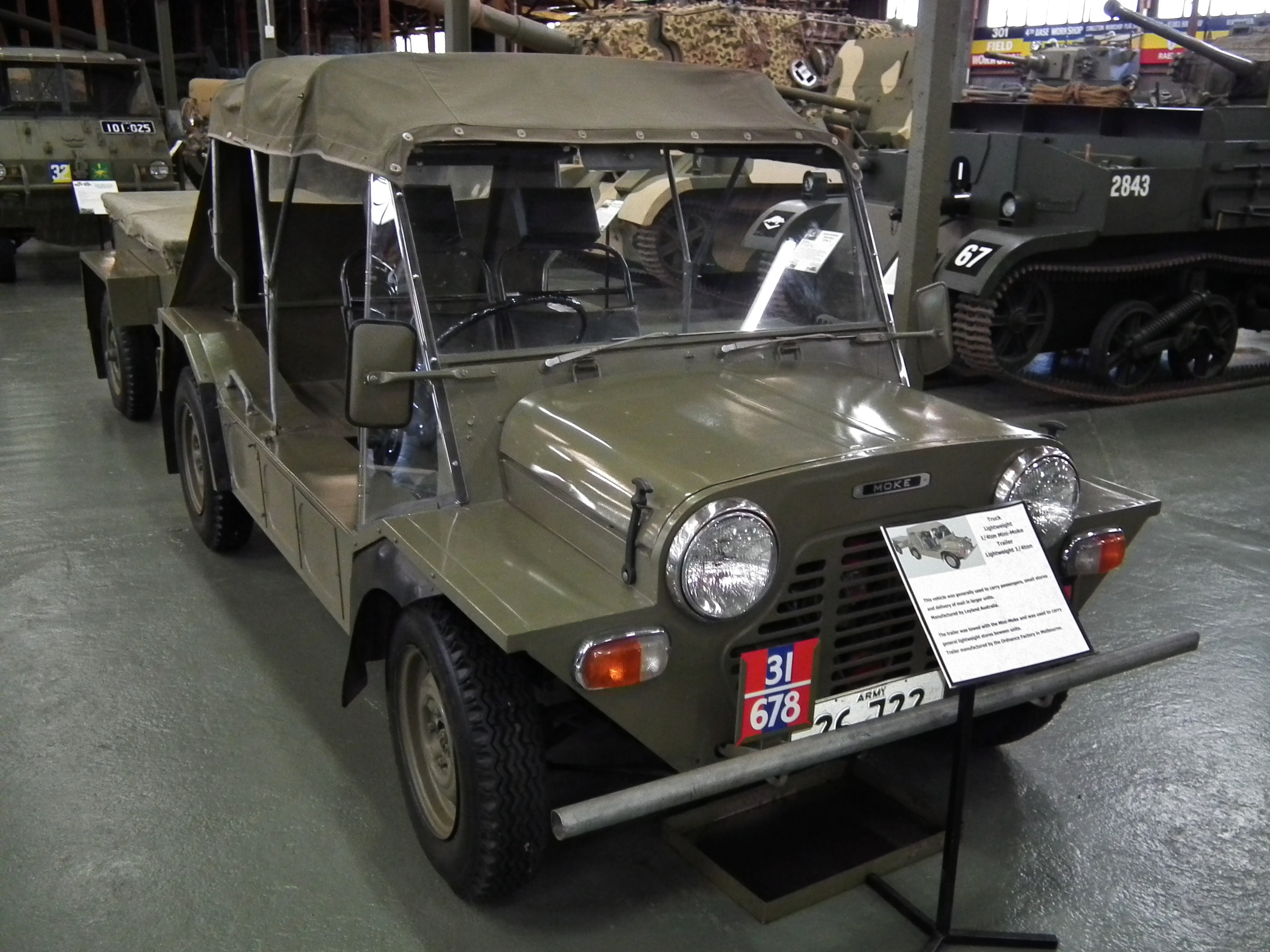
Australian Military Moke (Army Museum Bandiana)

=== British Mokes ===
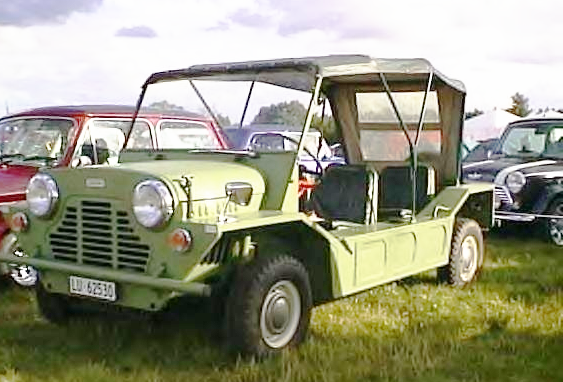
An early British Moke

When BMC gave up on the idea of selling the Moke to the military, in 1963 they marketed it as a civilian vehicle, targeting farmers and light commercial applications. Several prototypes were built in 1963, one of which is still known to exist in Pinner just outside London, England. The Moke was launched onto the British market in 1964. The British Customs and Excise department decided that the Moke should be classified as a passenger car rather than as a commercial vehicle, which meant that it attracted purchase tax, reducing sales in its intended commercial market.

British-made Mokes were fitted with a low-end 848 cc transverse inline-four engine, detuned to use low-octane fuel. They used the same suspension, gearbox and 10 inch wheels as the standard Mini. Originally, passenger seats, grab handles, heater, windscreen washer and a removable canvas top were optional equipment, installed by the owner. The base price was £ 405. The "Mk I" Mokes had a single windscreen wiper and a floor-mounted headlight dip switch, and the only colour available was "Spruce Green". In 1967, the "Mk II" Moke added a passenger-side wiper. Horn and headlight controls were moved onto the indicator stalk. These later British Mokes were also available in white.

The John Player & Sons cigarette company ran a team of Mokes in autocross competitions on grass tracks through 1968. These vehicles were equipped with rollover protection and used the Mini Cooper S 1275 cc engine.

Despite the lack of success in selling the Mini Moke to the British Armed Forces, an unknown number (unlikely to have been more than a handful) of examples were apparently used by Land Forces Falkland Islands during the Falklands War and its immediate aftermath; the source of these vehicles is unclear. At least one commandeered civilian Mini Moke was also used by the Argentinian Forces during their occupation of the islands.

The original Moke was made in Britain until 1968.

=== Australian Mokes ===
Starting in 1966, the Moke was built in Australia where it was originally marketed as the Morris Mini Moke, and from 1973 as the Leyland Moke. Initially Australian Mokes had the same 10-inch wheels as British Mokes and Mini saloons but in 1968 these were replaced by 13-inch wheels with longer rear trailing arms, which made them more practical for gentle off-road or beach use than the British version. There was also a widening piece welded to the wheel arches, front and rear to allow for wider tyres and rims. The solid metal seats of the British Mokes were replaced with tubular-framed "deck-chair" seats. This variant started with a 998 cc engine, which was switched mid-production to 1,098 cc. In 1976, with the advent of new anti-pollution requirements (Australian Design Rule 27A), the locally manufactured 1,098 cc motor was replaced by an imported version of the 998 cc motor with an air pump and exhaust gas recirculation, which had been developed to meet UK (US?) anti-pollution requirements.

For a brief period around 1971, Leyland Australia produced a variant referred to in Leyland literature as "Moke, special export", but commonly called a "Californian", which had a 1,275 cc engine and was fitted with side marker lamps and different rear lights to conform to US FMVSS standards. The fuel tank from the Austin Sprite or MG Midget was fitted beneath the rear load area, replacing the standard tank mounted in the left sidebox. The export Californian was readily recognisable by its roof and seats, trimmed in "Op-pop verve" black and white tiger-striped vinyl or "Orange Bali" vinyl, which looked rather like a fruit salad, and was briefly marketed to the "flower power" culture in the United States.

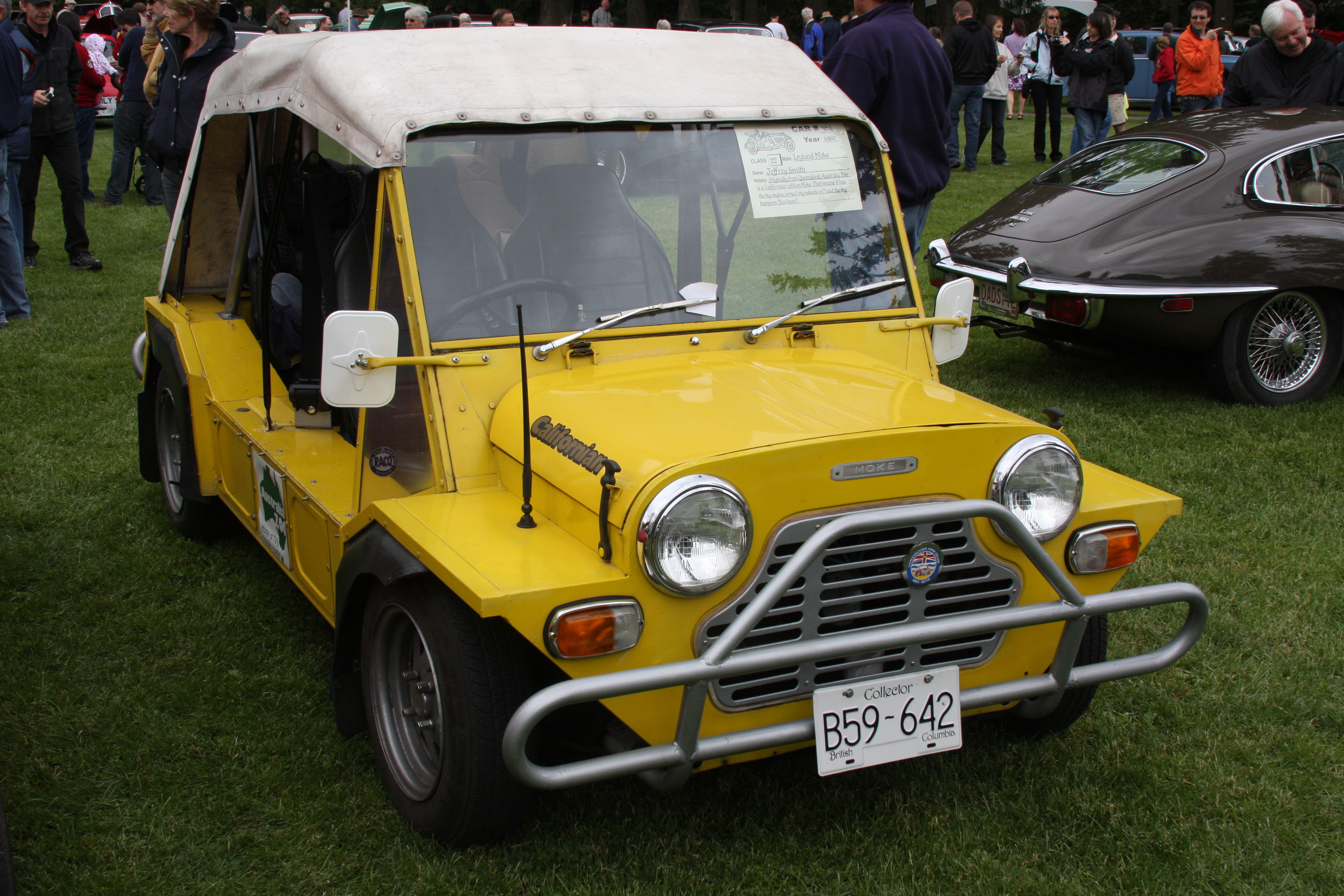
Leyland Mini Moke "Californian"

The name "Californian" and the 1275 cc motor were resurrected in 1977 for Australian market Mokes with denim seat covers, more comfortable seats (which concealed the same basic frame within), spoked wheels and complex tubular bumpers (known as "roo bars").

Australian Mokes were exported to many countries and pioneered large-scale exports of Australian-made vehicles. Leyland Australia made much of these exports in its advertising. The use of Australian-made Mokes by the Israeli Army (complete with a machine-gun tripod mounted in the rear) attracted controversy and media attention.

From 1975, a pickup version of the Moke was produced, with a 1.45 × 1.50 metre (55 × 59 in) drop-sided bed which protruded behind the back of the vehicle, and a cloth top over the cab area.

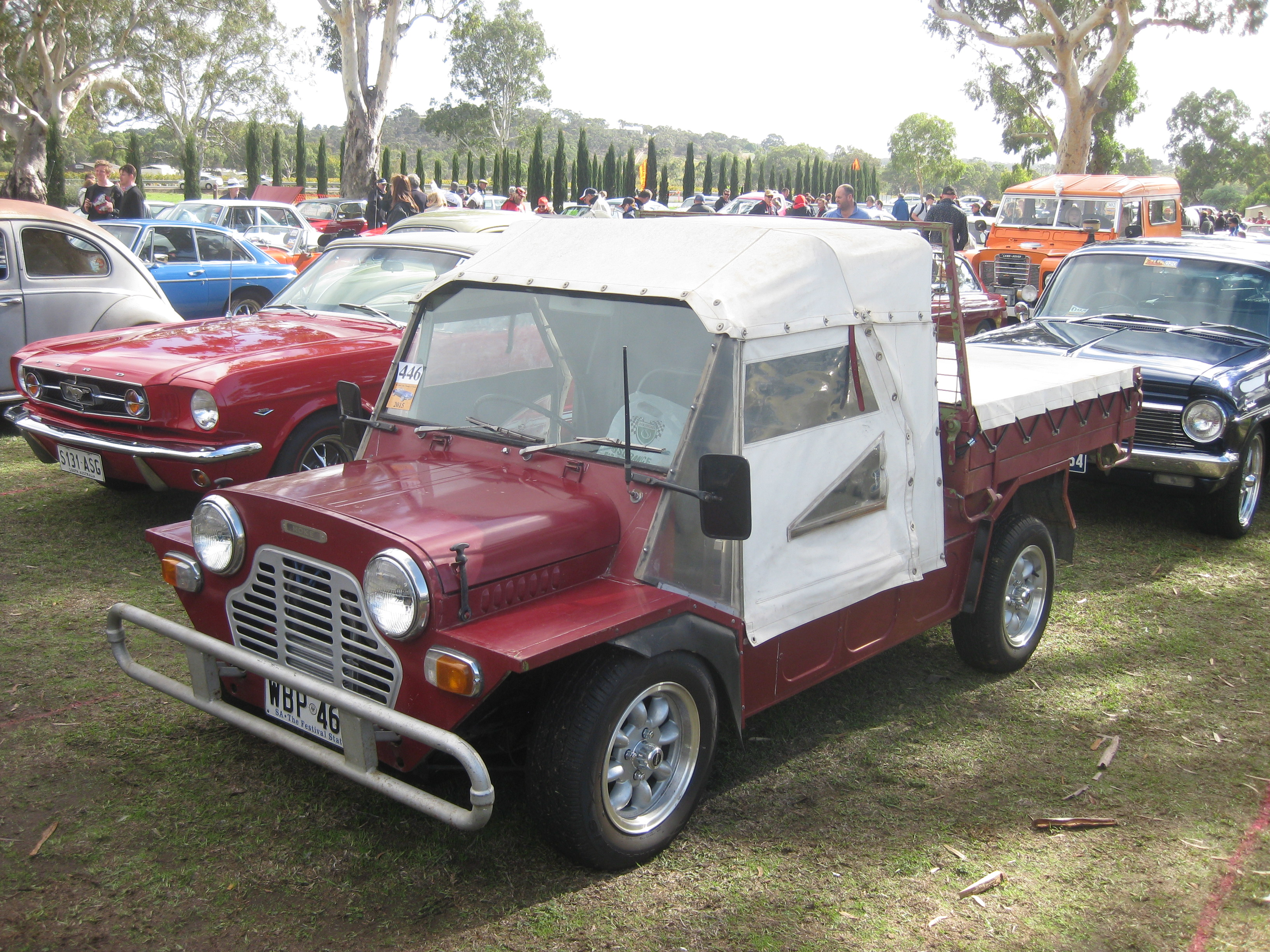
Leyland Moke pick-up with after-market wheels

At least two four-wheel drive Moke prototypes were manufactured by Leyland Australia in the late 1970s, but unlike the British version, these used just one engine. Leyland were planning to market this version, but Moke production in Australia ended in 1981 and all that remains of the project is one of the prototypes which is now owned by an enthusiast in Western Australia and a modified differential crownwheel with gearteeth cut in the side to drive the rear tailshaft, in the personal collection of a Melbourne Mini specialist.

In 1977, a 1275 cc Cooper S-engined Moke (sponsored by Coca-Cola) was entered into the Singapore Airlines London-Sydney Marathon. The car was driven over 30,000 km (19,000 miles) over 30 days and finished in 35th place.

Australian production of the Moke ended in 1981.

=== Portuguese Mokes ===
As Australian Moke production wound down, manufacturing was transferred to British Leyland's subsidiary in Portugal, which made 8,500 of the "Californian" Mokes in the Setúbal IMA plant between 1980 and 1984. In 1984 production was transferred to the Vendas Novas plant. Initially these Mokes were identical to late-model Australian Mokes; very soon, however, they were altered to use then-current British production Mini saloon components, including the standard-length Mini rear trailing arms and the 12–in wheels with modern low-profile tyres, which the saloon had acquired during the Moke's absence from Europe.

In April 1990, British Leyland (by then called Rover Group) sold the "Moke" name to Cagiva, a motorcycle manufacturer in Bologna, Italy. Production continued in Portugal under Cagiva's auspices until 1993, when Cagiva transferred the tooling to their own factory in Varese, Italy with the intention of restarting production there in 1995 — which they never did, although some unfinished cars were assembled in Italy. Cagiva was made to pay a considerably higher price for the Rover-made parts than had BL's Portuguese subsidiary, and the enterprise never made financial sense. The Cagiva-built Mokes have a new top with C-shaped openings, as well as plastic curve handles at the rear longitudinal elements of the rollover bar. Since Cagiva did not own the "Mini" name, the 2071 cars they built were sold simply as "Mokes". This brought the total production run of Mokes and Moke derivatives to about 50,000.

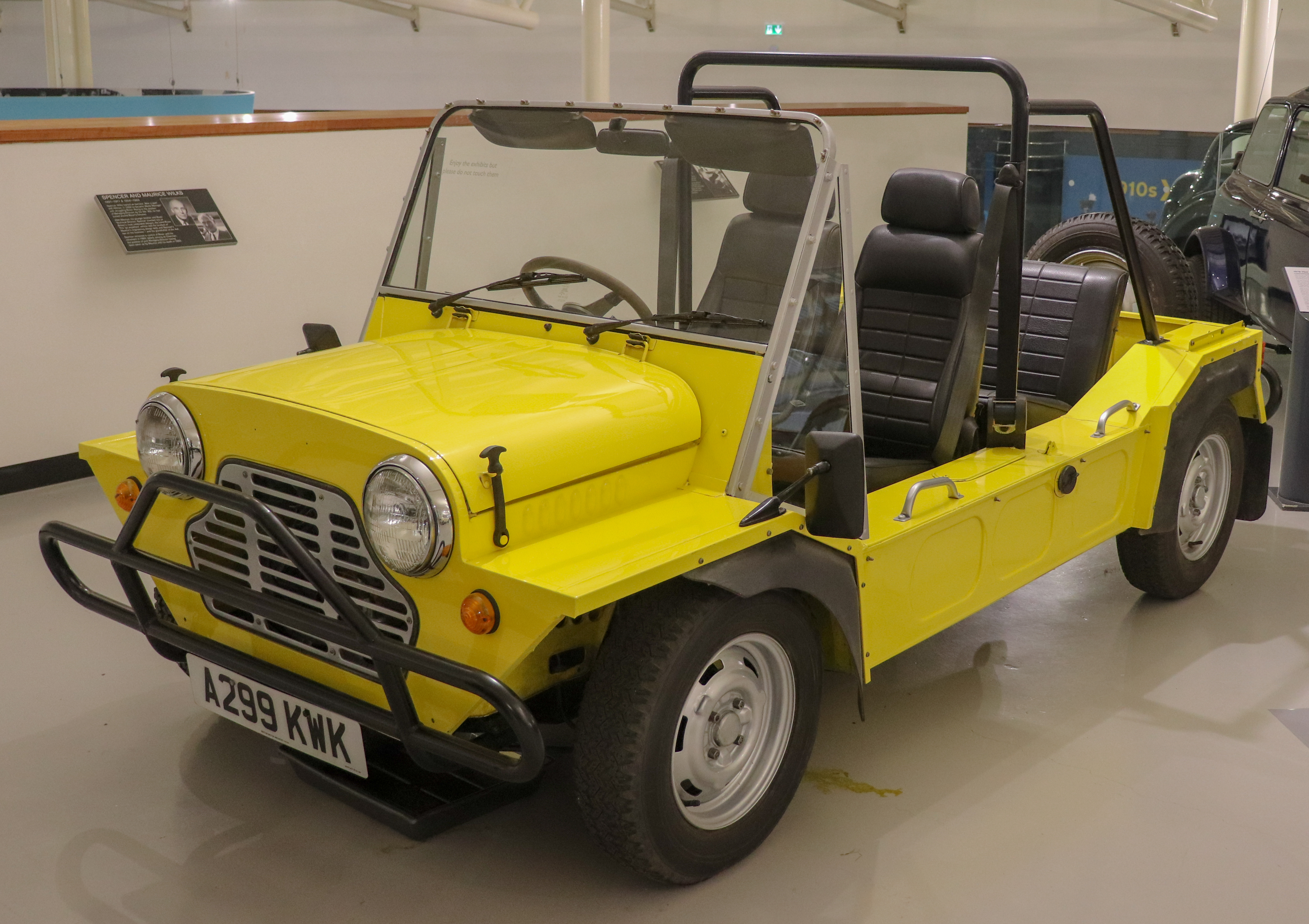
1984 British Leyland Moke, still using the Australian design with 13-inch wheels

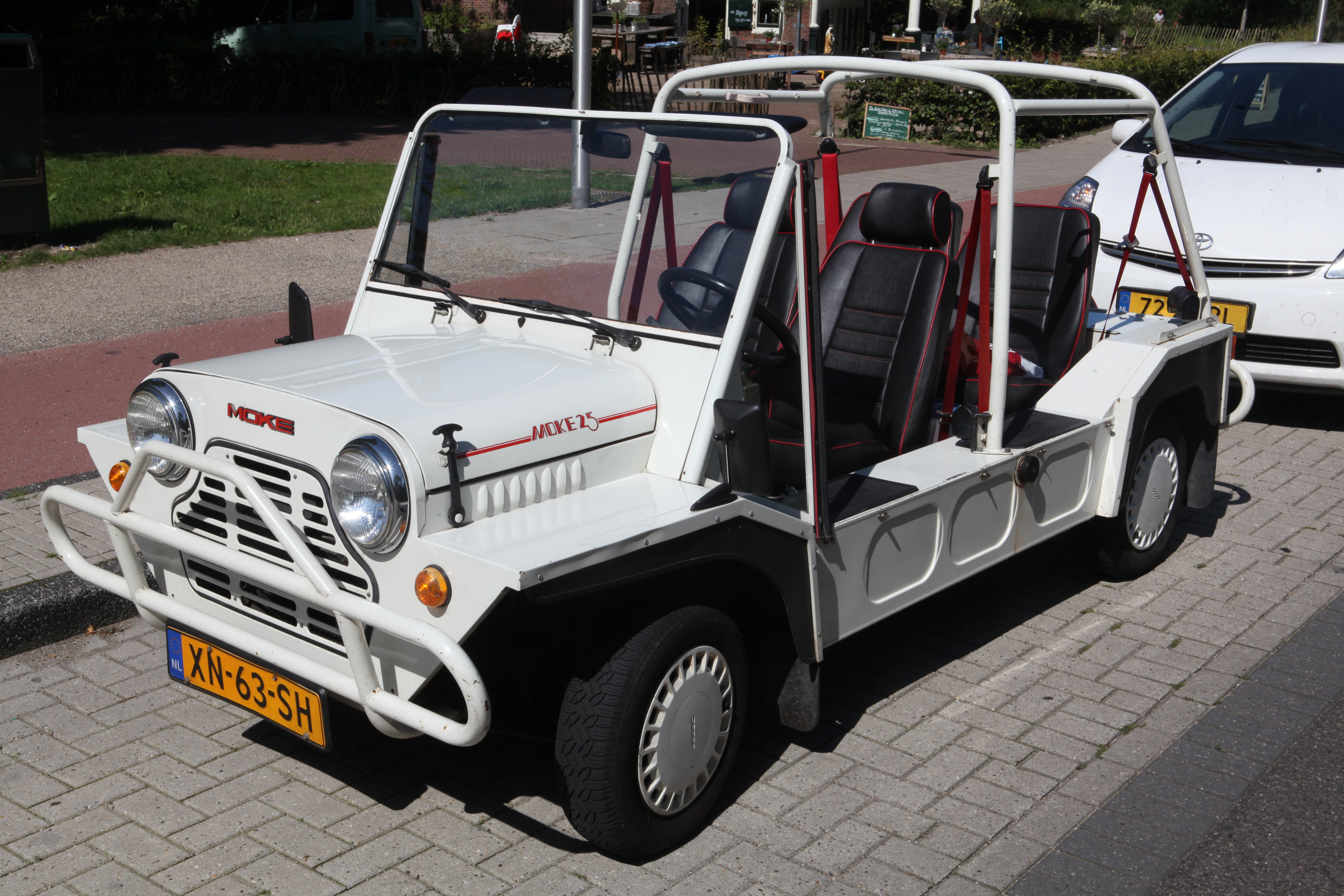
1989 Austin Rover Moke 25, a limited edition of 250 cars celebrating the Mini Moke's 25th anniversary

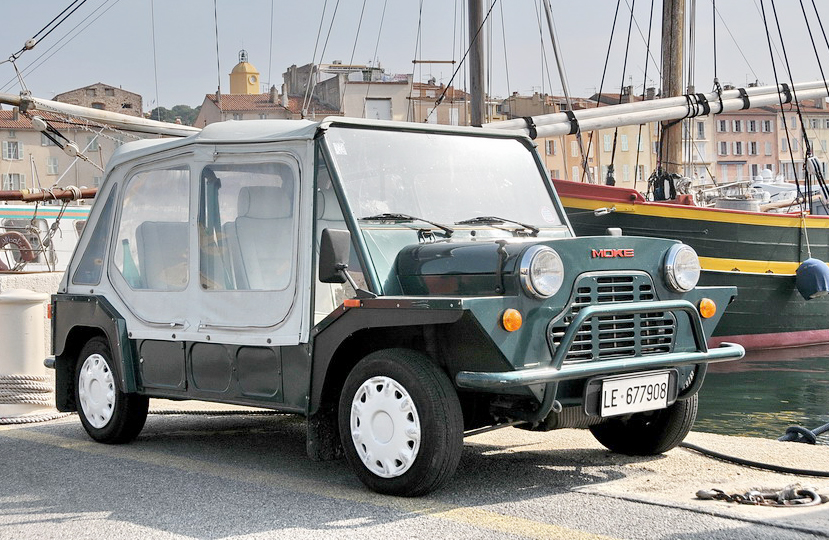
1990–1993 Cagiva Moke

=== Chinese Mokes ===
In 2012, MOKE International teamed up with designer Michael Young, Chery Automobile, and Sicar Engineering to design a new version of the Moke, styled MOKE, with the intention of releasing the car in Thailand, Australia, the Caribbean, the Seychelles and Mauritius, and Egypt by 2016. In 2013, Chery Automobile began manufacturing the reimagined Moke in China. The 2020 MOKE has a 1,083 cc four-cylinder fuel injected petrol engine with either manual or automatic transmission and was also made in France. An electric version based on this design has been manufactured in Britain since 2021. The Moke brand was acquired by EV Technology Group in 2022, since then the brand is now electric only except for the chinese market.

== Construction and maintenance ==
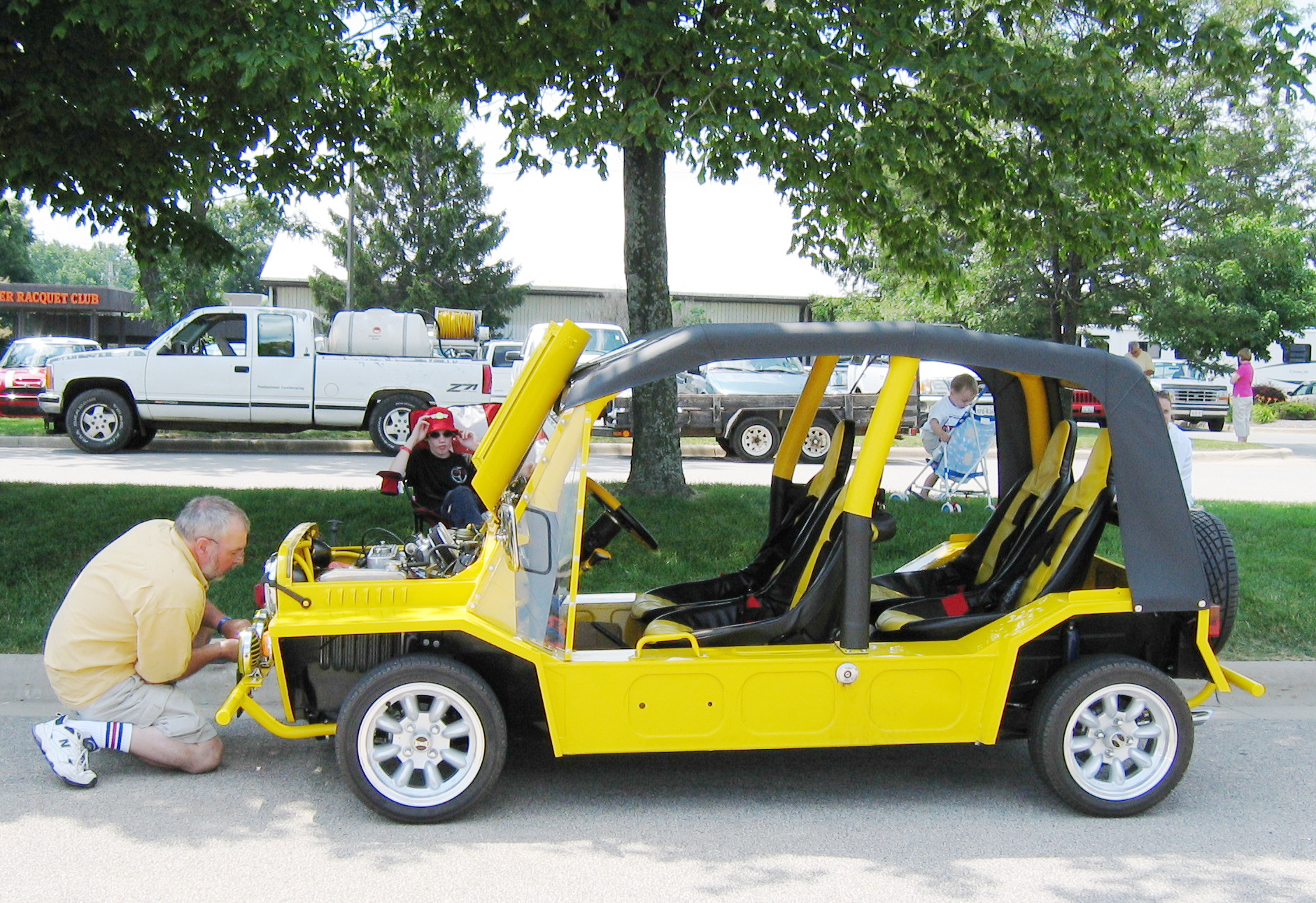
Mokes retain their cult status, and there are many enthusiastic restorers.

The Moke's construction is simple. The body mainly consists of two box-section "pontoons" or "sideboxes" running between the front and rear wheels and includes solid extensions running from the back of the car to the front. These are connected by the floor pan, the firewall and a sturdy lateral torque box that runs under the front seats and stiffens the body in torsion. The left-hand pontoon contains the fuel tank; the right-hand has a compartment for the battery and a small lockable storage area. The 1972 "Moke, Special Export", commonly referred to as a "Californian" Moke, has an Austin Sprite/MG Midget type fuel tank fitted beneath the rear floor area to meet the American FMVSS safety requirements of the time. Standard Mokes of the same period and later Californian Mokes use the conventional tank mounted in the left sidebox. Later Portuguese Mokes have additional lockable storage space at the rear of the vehicle. The optional cloth canopy has plastic side windows and is held up by a thin tubular structure that can easily be removed when not needed. In later versions this was replaced with a more solid roll cage. The windscreen can easily be unbolted and removed if not needed. There are just three curved panels in the Moke, the bonnet, the firewall and the floor, each of which is only curved in one direction. This makes it relatively straightforward to reproduce and replace Moke body components without access to sophisticated machine tools.

Because the Moke's A-Series engine, manual gearbox and suspension are identical to those of a standard Mini (which was still in production up to October 2000), most spare parts are still readily available. The Moke has no chassis, so the wheels, brake assemblies and suspension are attached to front and rear subframes bolted straight onto the monocoque shell, just as with a standard Mini. Mokes tend to require much structural maintenance if they are to stay in good running order.

== Kit cars, look-alikes, and customisations ==
The true Mini Moke was never available as a kit car, however as the basic Mini parts were easily available, many companies have assembled and marketed look-alikes, hybrid copies, and custom versions of the vehicle with names such as the Andersen "Mini-Cub", "Comet", Del Tech "Nomad", "Gecko", "Hobo", "Hustler", "Jimini", "Mini-Scout", "MPV" (a 6-wheeler), "Mule", "Navajo", "Ranger", "Mini Scamp", "Stimson", "Warrior", and the "Yak". Unusual one-off custom versions of the Mini Moke have also been created inspired by the original design, including a 454 hp Maserati V-8 powered example built by Lazareth Auto-Moto, and a three axle six-wheeler.

=== Island Mokes ===
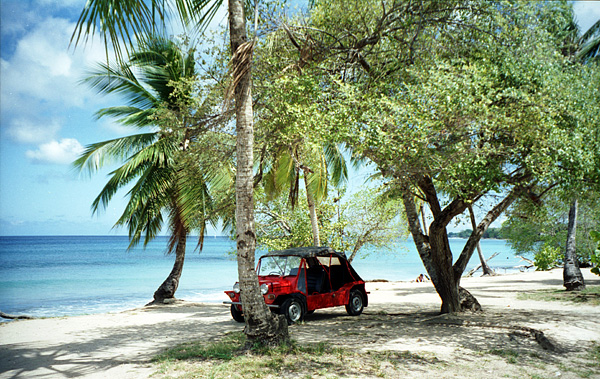
The Mini Moke is a popular rental car in the Seychelles, Barbados, Mauritius and many other tropical countries.

The Moke gained much popularity as a beach buggy and was often rented to tourists in tropical island resorts such as Mauritius and Barbados.

The car also found a market in Macau, where it became the official transport for the local police; the Happy-Rent-a-Car company also owned 43 of the vehicles, which were made available for hire until February 2006 when they were outlawed by new car safety laws. The Macau branch of the car rental company Avis ran a fleet of Moke look-alike "CUBs" until July 2007. The CUB, although it resembled the Moke, was designed by Charles Andersen of Liverpool, England and used a 1275 cc version of the A-Series engine.

On Magnetic Island, off Australia's Queensland coast, Moke Magnetic still operate a large fleet of Australian-made Mokes for hire to tourists.

The Mini Moke can still be seen around the town of Victoria, Seychelles, as it is still a popular mode of transport for tourists and can seat four people in relative comfort.

In the early 1970s, a Mini Moke was the first motor vehicle to be driven on Pitcairn Island and thereby became the most remote vehicle on Earth. It was chosen because it was the only off-road vehicle that could be lifted by the island's only crane—there being no dock or airstrip at Pitcairn. However, the rough terrain and heavy rainfall proved too much for the Moke and it soon broke down. Eventually, a second and later a third Moke were sent to the island, and by cannibalising the three for spares, the island's sole vehicle remained running until at least 1988.

=== Railway Mokes ===
The Moke was identified as an ideal conversion for use in railway service.

Two differing modifications were made: one using backing plates and spacers, the other a more conventional road–rail system.

Tasmanian Government Railways ran a fleet, estimated at 16, of hard-topped Mokes for inspection and maintenance service on its narrow-gauge network. These Mokes had slightly modified suspension, and used spacers and backing plates so that the wheels sat on and tracked on 3 ft 6 in (1,067 mm) gauge track. Similarly, the Federal Government, through either its Commonwealth Railways or Australian National Railways Commission, ran at least two similarly set up Mokes on its Central Australia Railway. At least one of these Mokes also operated on the isolated Eyre Peninsula network.

George E Moss and Co (trading as GEMCO) developed a road-rail system based on a Western Australian Government Railways design which was fitted to at least two Mokes: one used by the District Engineer, Perth, and the other by the District Engineer, Northam.

=== Electric Mokes ===
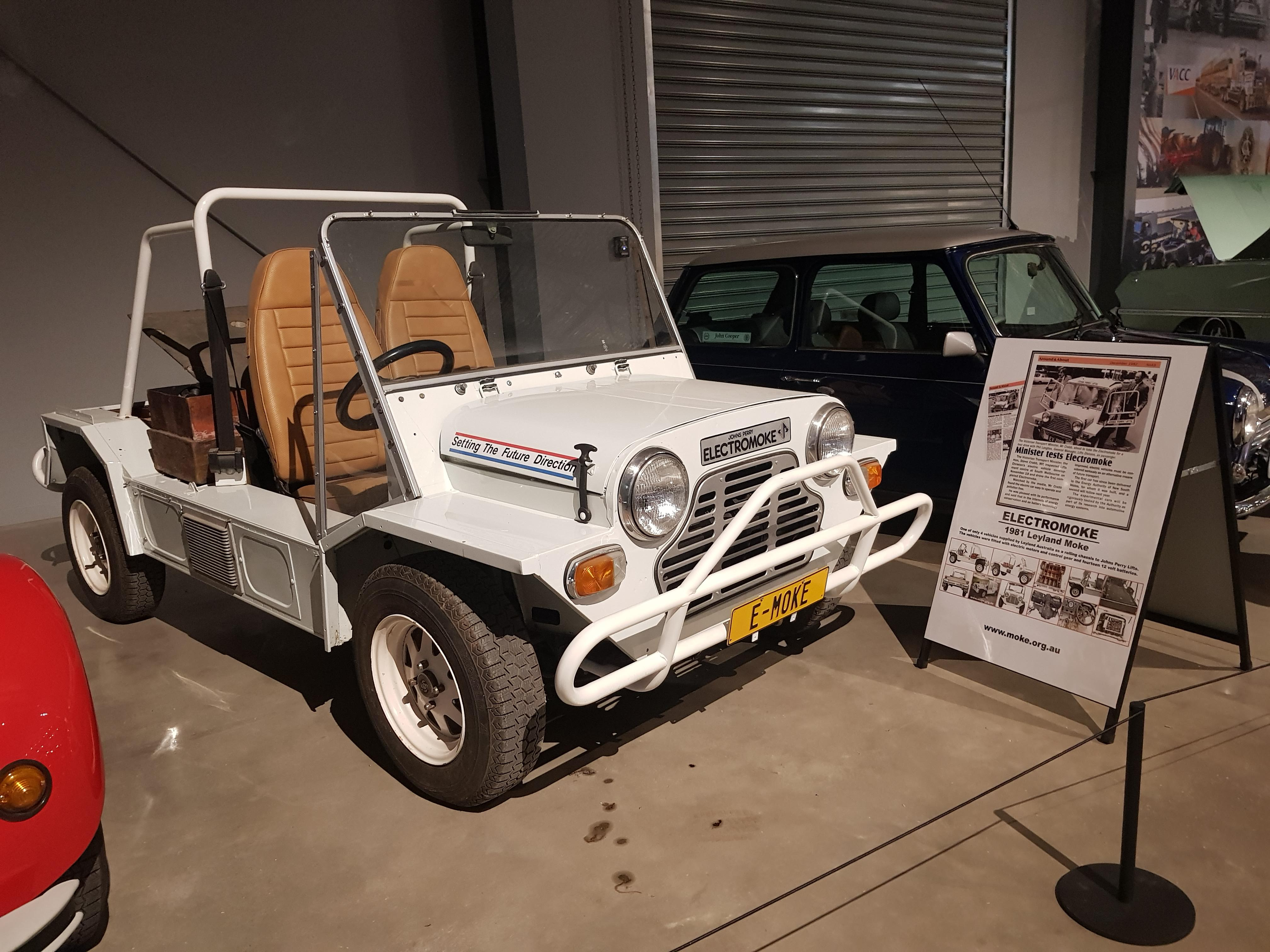
Electromoke on static display at the Museum of Vehicle Evolution

In 1981, Melbourne engineering firm Johns Perry developed the "Electromoke", as part of a Victorian State Government trial investigating energy conservation. Four Leyland Mokes were produced without engines or wipers, and then fitted with elevator motors and car batteries. The rear suspension had to be upgraded due to the battery weight. The vehicles were tested by Australia Post, the State Electricity Commission of Victoria and the Electricity Commission of New South Wales. A change of government, high cost, poor performance, and the demise of the Leyland factory meant the project went no further. The one remaining Electromoke is on static display at the Museum of Vehicle Evolution, Shepparton.

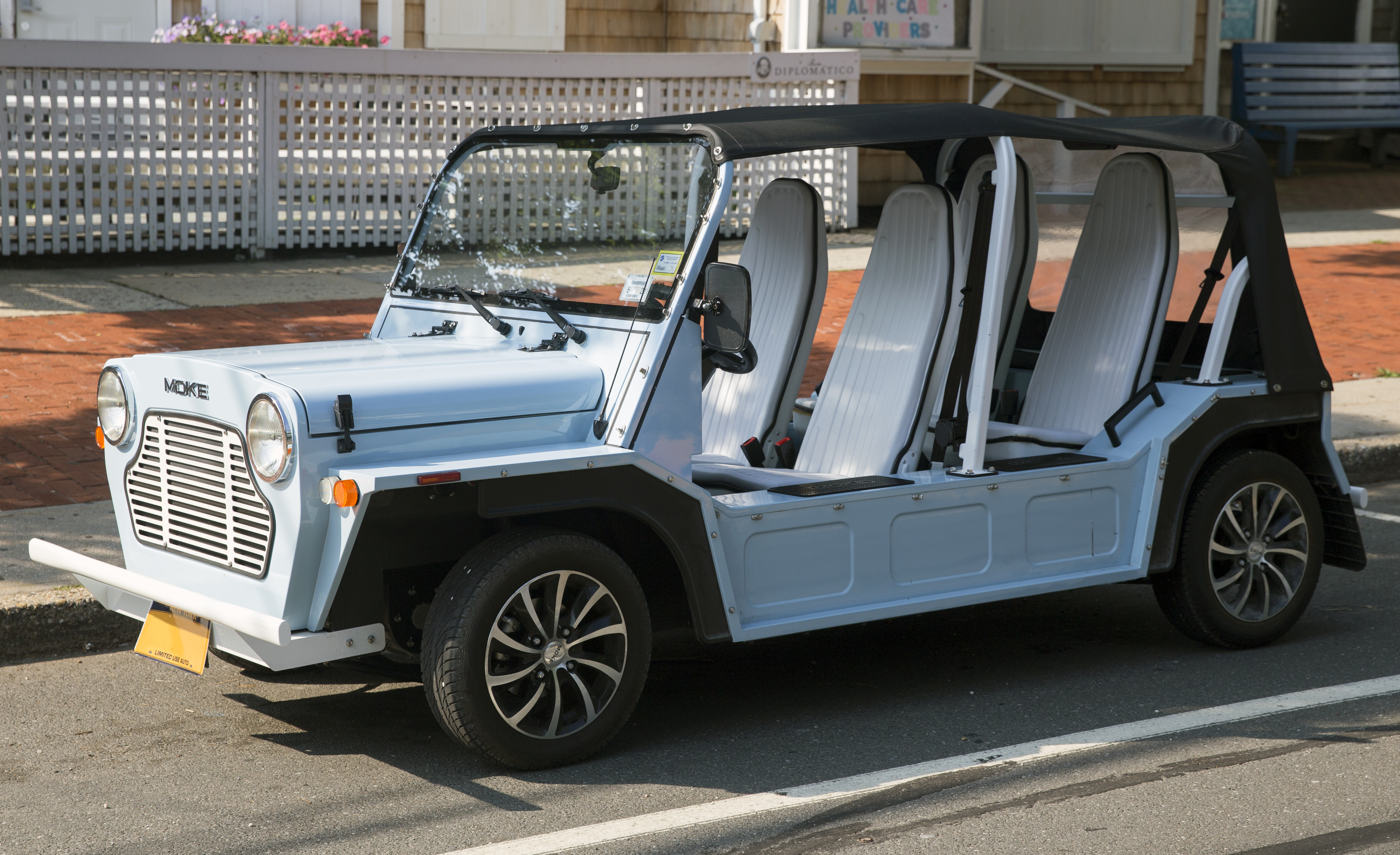
The Moke America eMoke by Chery/MOKE International/Cruise Car

A new design inspired by the Mini Moke was developed by Chery subsidiary Sicar Engineering and MOKE International in around 2007. This Chinese-manufactured design is assembled and distributed by various small companies in France, England, and United States.

== Future Mokes ==
While BMW-owned Mini has discussed other vehicles named after the Moke, no production has ever taken place. A concept car called the MINI Beachcomber, which draws heavily on Moke styling, was used to build interest for the upcoming Mini Countryman.

== In popular culture ==
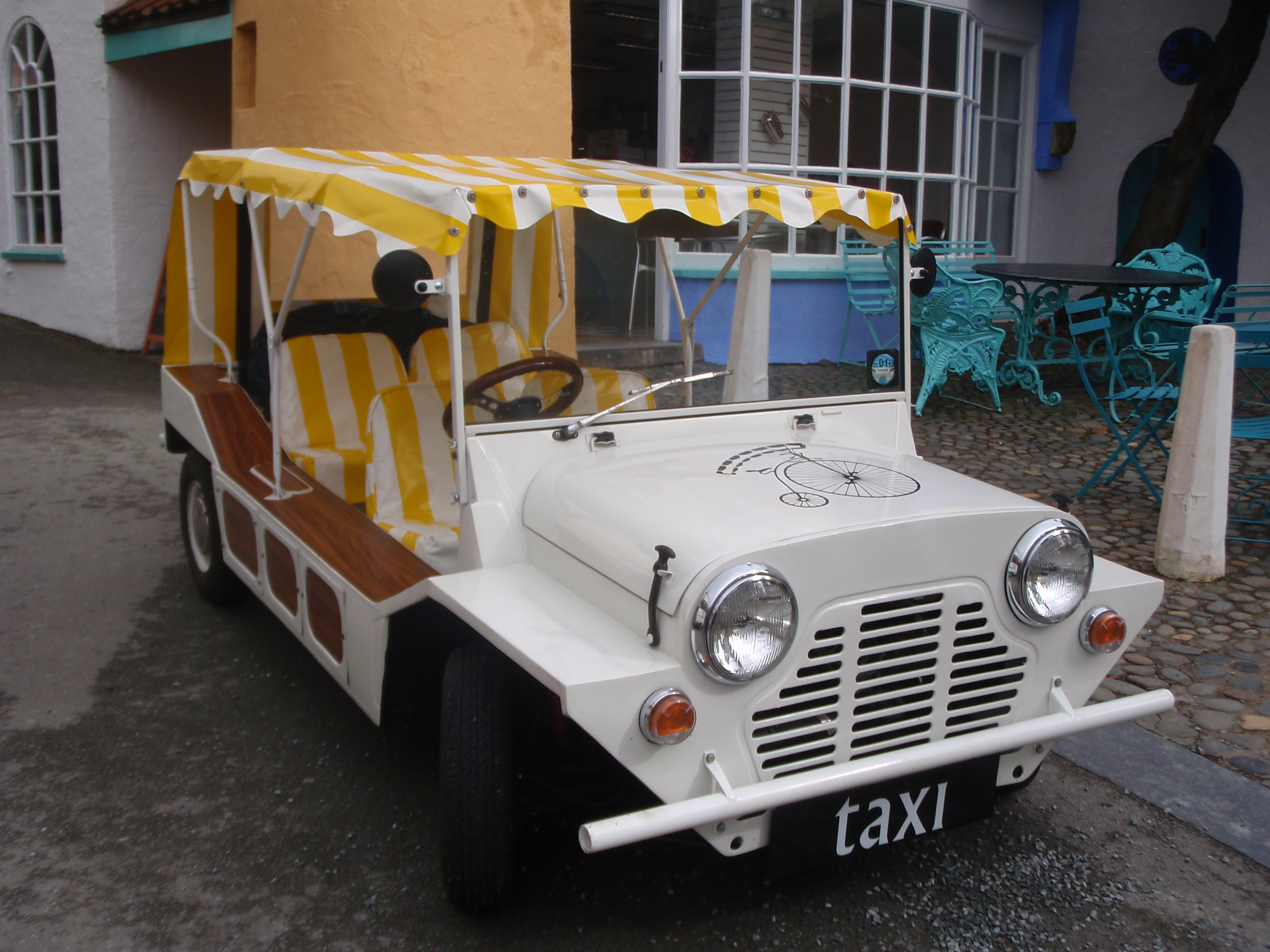
Mini Moke taxi from The Prisoner

The Moke attracted attention via media exposure, including the 1965 John Boorman film Catch Us If You Can (in which a Moke is driven by the Dave Clark Five), many appearances in the television series The Prisoner starring Patrick McGoohan (1967–68), as well as in popular songs such as the English rock group Traffic's recording of "Berkshire Poppies". The Moke also features in four James Bond movies: You Only Live Twice, Live and Let Die, The Spy Who Loved Me, and Moonraker, as well as the films Emmanuelle, Carry on Camping and the Doctor Who story Fury from the Deep. In total, the Moke has made cameo appearances in over 70 films. The Beatles and the Beach Boys were also photographed behind the wheel of a Moke. Despite these cultural references and celebrity associations, only about a tenth of the 14,500 British produced Mokes were sold in the United Kingdom, although Mokes continued to be made in Britain until 1968.

The Moke met with renewed success in the 1980s after French actress and model Brigitte Bardot was pictured driving a Moke with her dogs in St. Tropez, France.

In 1982, the Seychelles issued a commemorative "Transportation" postage stamp featuring the Mini Moke.

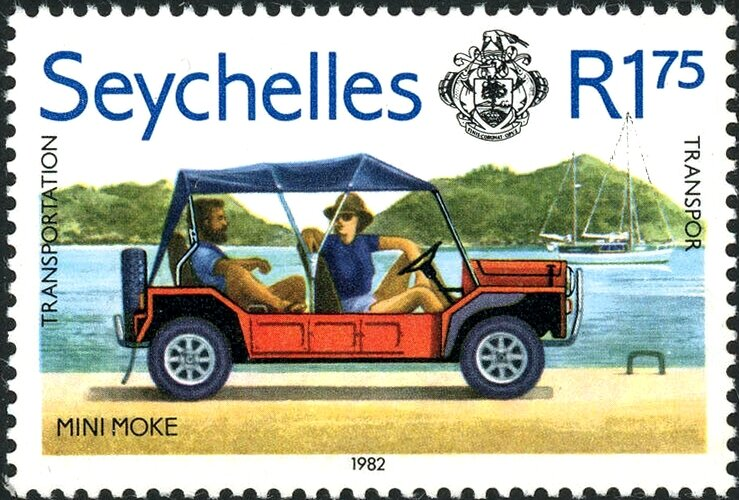

In 2016, the Moke was included in an exhibition titled "AL(L) Projects with Aluminum", curated by Maria Cristina Didero at the Grand-Hornu in Belgium. The show explored experimentation with aluminium in art, design, and industry.

A "Panorama Mokes" event was held In October 2016 which brought together a group of Mini Mokes alongside their "tin top" cousins the "Classic Minis" which met at Bathurst, New South Wales, Australia. Alongside the Minis, the MOKE also celebrated 50 years since production in Australia and participated in a four-day event with everyone arriving on cue to the 2016 Supercheap Auto Bathurst 1000.

In 2021, the Moke that featured in The Prisoner sold at auction for £69,750. The last petrol powered Moke revival was sold at the Blenheim Palace Ball auction in 2022. The proceeds of the event were donated to the charity Starlight UK.

In 2024, a red Mini Moke is seen being driven by the principal character Mackenzie Clarke (played by Anna Samson) in the series Return to Paradise.

== See also ==
- Citroën Méhari – Lightweight recreational and utility vehicle
- Fiat 500 Jolly – 1960s rear-engine small city car
- Meyers Manx – Two-passenger recreational kit car
- Renault Rodeo – Off-road mini sport utility vehicle
- Volkswagen Type 181 – Small convertible utility vehicle
