= Mini Scamp =

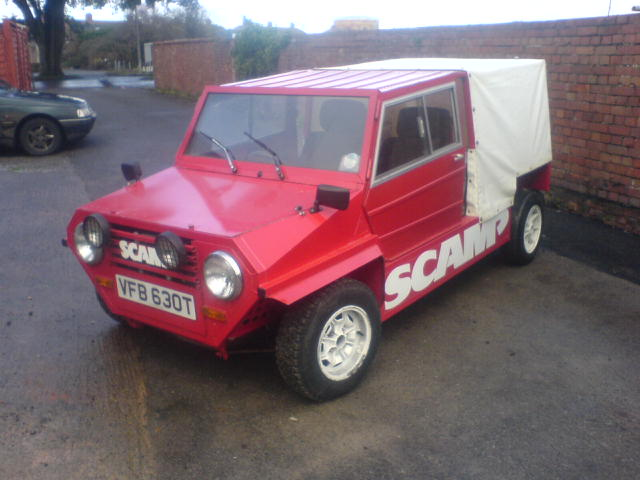
Mk3 Mini Scamp

The Mini Scamp is a Mini based kit car inspired by the Mini Moke, manufactured by Andrew MacLean and the Scamp Motor Company in West Sussex. The Mk1 Mini Scamp was built in 1969. Shortly thereafter, BMC stopped production of the Mini Moke in Longbridge.

The first Mark 1 kits, which were styled similarly to the Mini Moke, were produced by Robert Mandry in Ottershaw, Surrey, England. Parts from a Classic Mini were used with all its running gear and both front and rear sub-frames.

The Scamp body/chassis is made from a steel, square-tube, box section frame fitted with aluminum panels. Options included a van, estate, or pick-up body, four or six wheel chassis, and short or long wheelbase. Power units range from 850cc to 1400cc with a multitude of modifications. Nearly every Scamp is different, as most of the car is left up to the owner to complete.

The Mark 2 version was launched in 1978, which had a squarer body and stronger chassis, not using the mini rear subframe. In 1987 Scamp manufacturing and ownership was taken over by Scamp enthusiast Andrew MacLean, a retained firefighter from Turners Hill. A factory was set up in East Grinstead, Sussex but was moved to Rowfant, Crawley, Sussex.

The Mark 3 version started production in 1988 with demonstrator appearing in Kit Car and Mini magazines. The Scamp Mk3 GT Scamp appeared in Top Gear magazine. This was followed by a version built on either a Suzuki SJ chassis or the Daihatsu F50/F55. In 2011 the Scamp Motor Company acquired the manufacturing rights to the RTV, the Rough Terrain Vehicle, also based on the Classic Mini running gear.
