= Moke (slang) =

Slang word

Moke is a term used in the British Isles as slang for "donkey". In Australia it refers to a nag or inferior horse, and is employed by residents of the Hawaiian Islands in similar fashion as the British to derogatorily describe segments of the local Polynesian population. In practice, the word "moke" is similar to "redneck", as it is only used to describe a certain personality type, instead of an entire ethnic group.

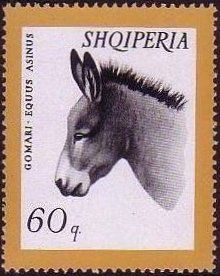
Albanian postage stamp depicting Equus asinus (Donkey)

== In literature ==
Later portrayals include W. S. Merwin's The Folding Cliffs, and Paul Theroux's Hotel Honolulu.

Also of note is the reference in Captain Joshua Slocum's Voyage of the Liberdade, where the term refers to a native of the Bahamas.

The term appears in the song "Wot Cher! Knocked 'em in the Old Kent Road" (1891).

J. R. R. Tolkien uses the word in the poem "Perry the Winkle;" e.g., "then all the people went with a will, by pony, cart, or moke".

== See also ==
- Moke, definition on Wiktionary
- Mook, definition on Wiktionary
- Mini Moke, small British utility vehicle (styled "MOKE" in post-2012 revival version)
