= John Sheppard (car designer) =

British car designer (1922–2015)

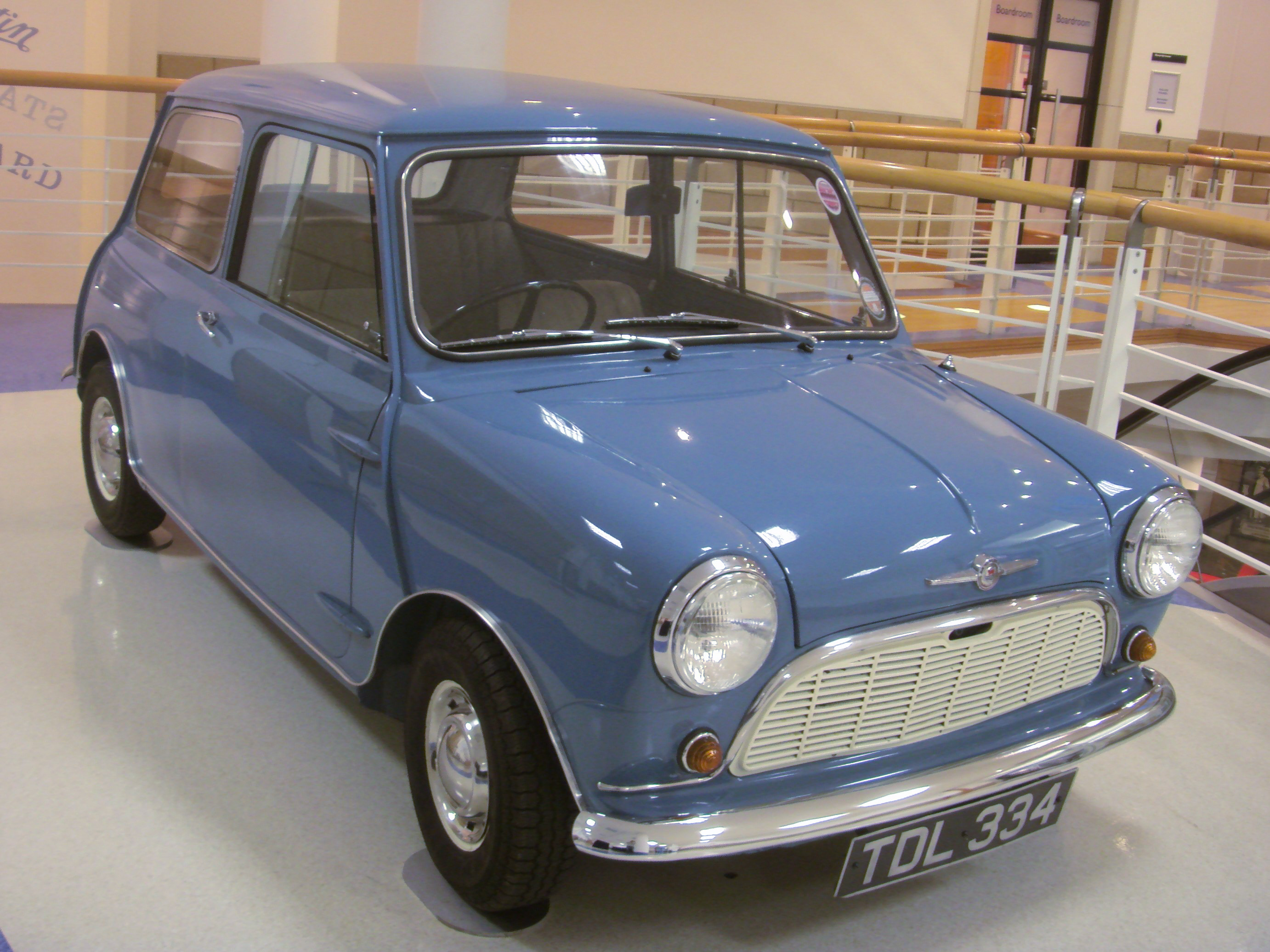
Sheppard designed much of the body for the Austin Mini (pictured example from 1959, collection of the Morris Mini-Minor Heritage Motor Centre, Gaydon, UK).

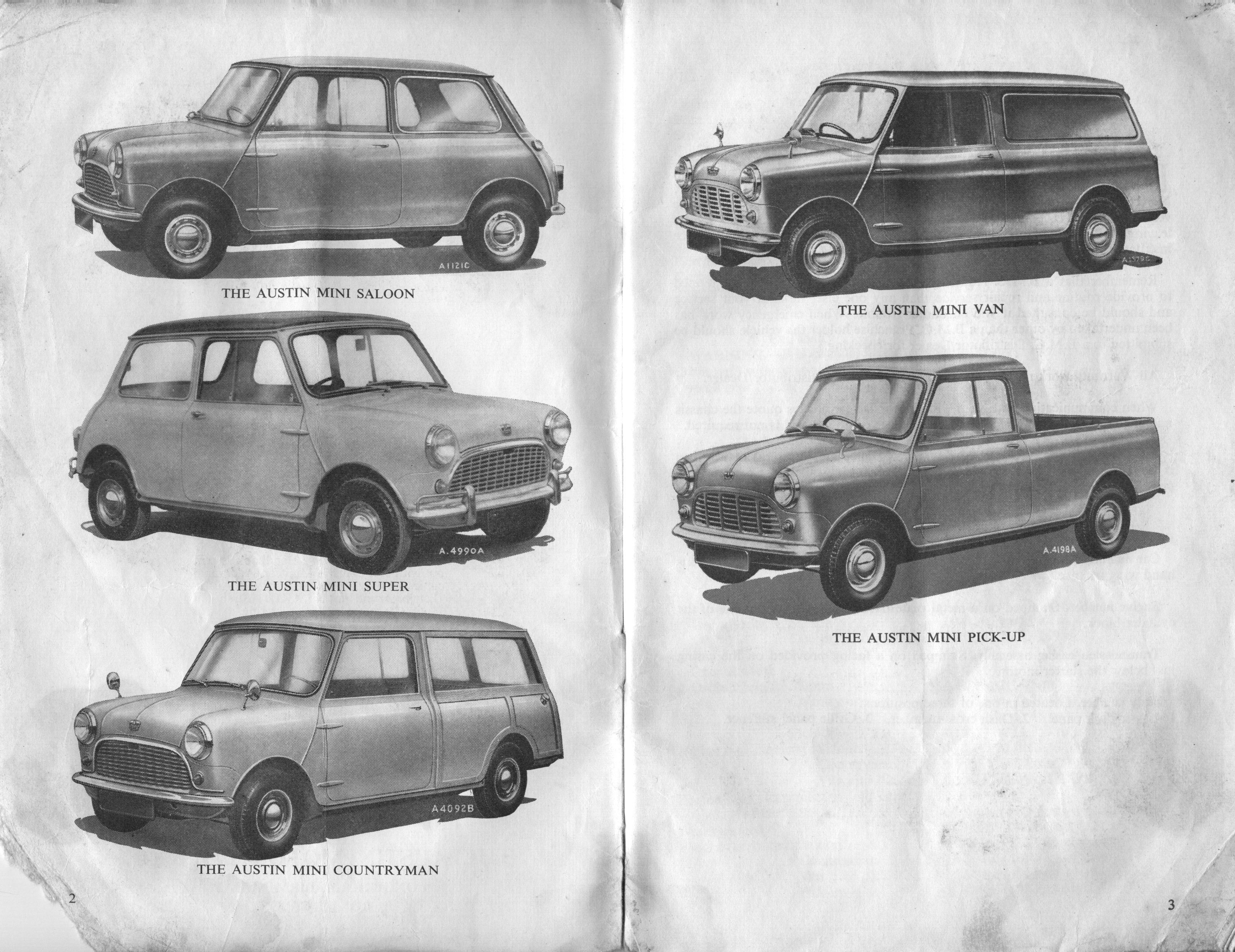
1961 Austin Mini model range

John Sheppard (24 February 1922 – 29 March 2015) was a car designer who worked with Alec Issigonis on the Austin Mini and later on British Leyland's Metro, Maestro and Montego. He also designed the body for the Mini Moke.

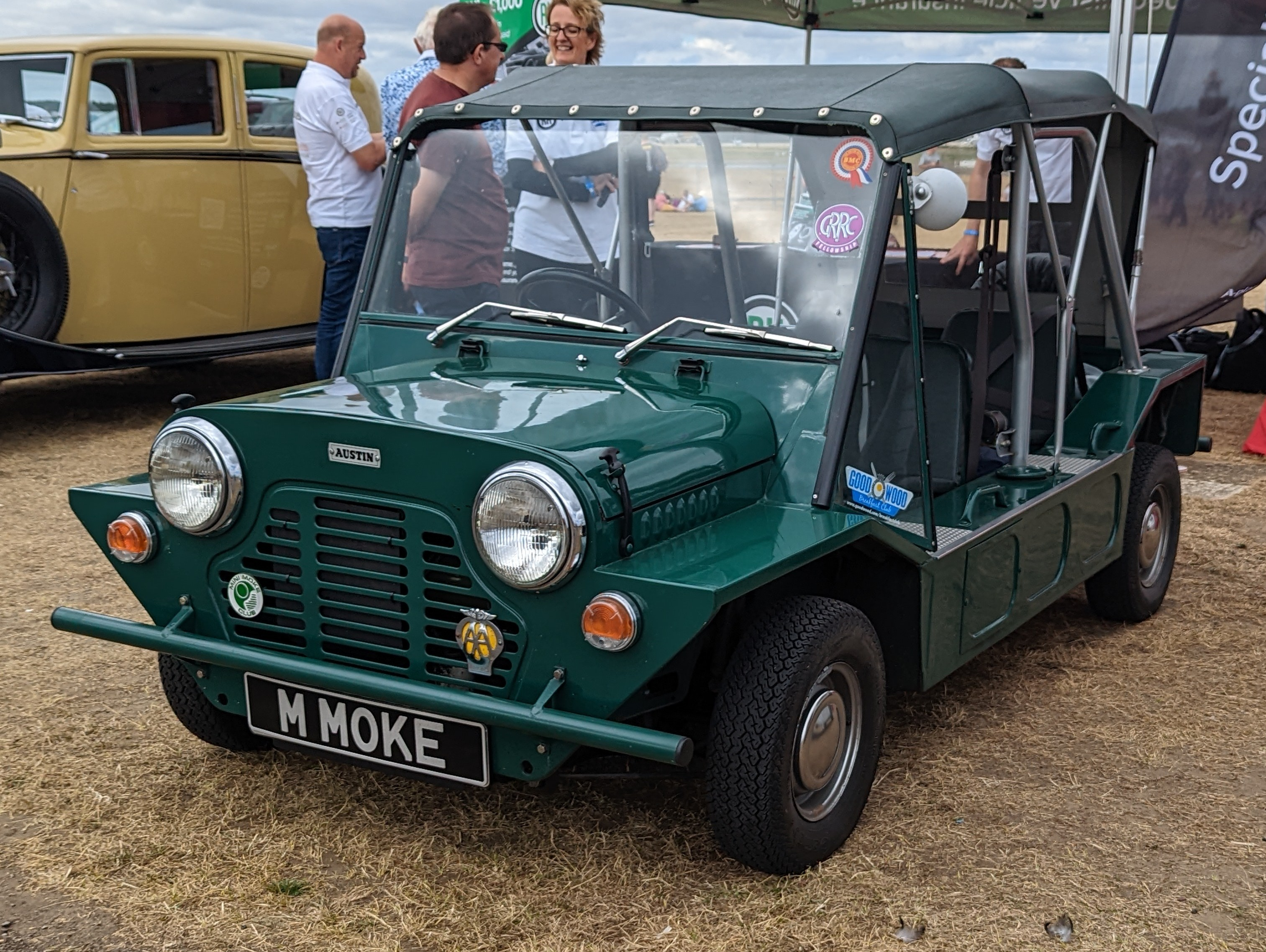
Austin Mini Moke
