= Hang Seng (disambiguation) =

Hang Seng may refer to:

- Hang Seng Bank, a bank in Hong Kong
- Stock market indices by Hang Seng Bank for companies listed on the Stock Exchange of Hong Kong:
  - Hang Seng Index, the major index reflecting stock market performance in Hong Kong
  - Hang Seng China Enterprises Index
  - Hang Seng China-Affiliated Corporations Index
  - Hang Seng Composite Index Series
- Stock market indices by Hang Seng Bank
  - Hang Seng China 50 Index
- Hang Seng University of Hong Kong, a university in Hong Kong
  - Hang Seng School of Commerce, the predecessor of Hang Seng University
