= Hang Seng China Enterprises Index =

Stock market index

- Traditional Chinese: 恒生中國企業指數
- Simplified Chinese: 恒生中国企业指数
Transcriptions
Standard Mandarin
- Hanyu Pinyin: Héng shēng zhōng guó qǐ yè zhǐ shù
Yue: Cantonese
- Jyutping: Hang4 saang1 zung1 gwok3 kei5 jip6 zi2 sou3

Alternative Chinese name
- Traditional Chinese: 國企指數
- Simplified Chinese: 国企指数
Transcriptions
Yue: Cantonese
- Jyutping: Gwok3 kei5 zi2 sou3

Hang Seng China Enterprises Index is a stock market index listed on the Hong Kong Stock Exchange. It tracks H shares, red chip stocks, and P chips.

In August 2017, it was announced that the index would be reformed, with P chips and red chips added to the index from March 2018.

Some of the constituents of Hang Seng China Enterprises Index were also constituents of Hang Seng Index.

== Constituents ==
As of August 2022 there are 50 constituent stocks.

| Ticker | Name | Weighting (%) | Industry |
|---|---|---|---|
| SEHK: 9988 | Alibaba Group | 8.28 | Information Technology |
| SEHK: 3690 | Meituan | 8.27 | Information Technology |
| SEHK: 700 | Tencent | 7.72 | Information Technology |
| SEHK: 939 | China Construction Bank | 7.38 | Financials |
| SEHK: 9618 | JD.com | 5.14 | Information Technology |
| SEHK: 941 | China Mobile | 4.66 | Telecommunications |
| SEHK: 1398 | ICBC | 4.26 | Financials |
| SEHK: 2318 | Ping An Insurance | 4.24 | Financials |
| SEHK: 3988 | Bank of China | 3.17 | Financials |
| SEHK: 1211 | BYD Company | 3.07 | Consumer Discretionary |
| SEHK: 1810 | Xiaomi | 2.92 | Information Technology |
| SEHK: 883 | CNOOC Limited | 2.74 | Energy |
| SEHK: 2331 | Li-Ning | 2.45 | Consumer Discretionary |
| SEHK: 3968 | China Merchants Bank | 2.27 | Financials |
| SEHK: 1024 | Kuaishou | 2.12 | Information Technology |
| SEHK: 2319 | Mengniu Dairy | 1.63 | Consumer Staples |
| SEHK: 1109 | China Resources Land | 1.49 | Properties & Construction |
| SEHK: 2020 | Anta Sports | 1.48 | Consumer Discretionary |
| SEHK: 175 | Geely | 1.38 | Consumer Discretionary |
| SEHK: 9633 | Nongfu Spring | 1.36 | Consumer Staples |
| SEHK: 2688 | ENN Energy | 1.31 | Utilities |
| SEHK: 386 | Sinopec | 1.3 | Energy |
| SEHK: 291 | China Resources Beer | 1.28 | Consumer Staples |
| SEHK: 9999 | NetEase | 1.26 | Information Technology |
| SEHK: 2628 | China Life Insurance Company | 1.21 | Financials |
| SEHK: 688 | China Overseas Land and Investment | 1.17 | Properties & Construction |
| SEHK: 1288 | Agricultural Bank of China | 1.14 | Financials |
| SEHK: 2382 | Sunny Optical | 1.11 | Industrials |
| SEHK: 1093 | Shijiazhuang Pharma Group | 1.03 | Healthcare |
| SEHK: 981 | SMIC | 1.02 | Information Technology |
| SEHK: 2313 | Shenzhou International | 0.98 | Consumer Discretionary |
| SEHK: 9888 | Baidu | 0.96 | Information Technology |
| SEHK: 6618 | JD Health | 0.88 | Healthcare |
| SEHK: 267 | CITIC Limited | 0.85 | Conglomerates |
| SEHK: 968 | Xinyi Solar | 0.77 | Industrials |
| SEHK: 1658 | Postal Savings Bank of China | 0.74 | Financials |
| SEHK: 992 | Lenovo | 0.68 | Information Technology |
| SEHK: 1177 | Sino Biopharmaceutical Limited | 0.68 | Healthcare |
| SEHK: 960 | Longfor Properties | 0.67 | Properties & Construction |
| SEHK: 1801 | Innovent Biologics | 0.64 | Healthcare |
| SEHK: 2601 | China Pacific Insurance Company | 0.63 | Financials |
| SEHK: 3328 | Bank of Communications | 0.57 | Financials |
| SEHK: 384 | China Gas | 0.49 | Utilities |
| SEHK: 6186 | China Feihe | 0.46 | Consumer Staples |
| SEHK: 2618 | JD Logistics | 0.45 | Industrials |
| SEHK: 6098 | CG Services | 0.45 | Properties & Construction |
| SEHK: 6862 | Haidilao | 0.37 | Consumer Discretionary |
| SEHK: 241 | Alibaba Health | 0.31 | Healthcare |
| SEHK: 9626 | Bilibili | 0.28 | Information Technology |
| SEHK: 2007 | Country Garden | 0.27 | Properties & Construction |

== See also ==
- Hang Seng Index - blue chip index of the Stock Exchange of Hong Kong
- Hang Seng China-Affiliated Corporations Index - index for Red chip of the Stock Exchange of Hong Kong
