= Hang Seng Global Composite Index =

The Hang Seng Global Composite Index (HSGCI) is one of the Hong Kong stock market indexes produced by the Hang Seng Indexes Company Limited. HSGCI was launched on 5 September 2011. It serves as an index that reflects the overall performance of all companies (including foreign companies) listed on the Stock Exchange of Hong Kong ("HKEX").

== Coverage ==
HSGCI is calculated on the price movement of listed securities in HKEX consists of:

- all securities that have their primary listing on the Main Board of the HKEX; and
- the securities / depositary receipts which have been classified as foreign companies and listed on HKEX.

Foreign companies refer to companies which are incorporated overseas, i.e. outside Hong Kong and mainland China, and have a majority of their business overseas.

== Constituents ==
Securities which are either constituents of Hang Seng Composite Index or Hang Seng Foreign Companies Composite Index will be selected as constituents of the Hang Seng Global Composite Index.

== See also ==
- Hang Seng Index
- Hang Seng Composite Index
