= Hang Seng China A Industry Top Index =

One of the Hong Kong stock market indexes

The Hang Seng China A Industry Top Index (HSCAIT) is one of the Hong Kong stock market indexes produced by the Hang Seng Indexes Company Limited. HSCAIT was launched on 21 Sep 2009. It is used to reflect the performance of A-share index that captures all the industry leaders in mainland China. The performance of industry leaders in each of the 11 industries under the Hang Seng Industry Classification System is tracked through this index.

== Features ==
Key features of HSCATT include the following:

- Reflects the performance of leading companies in each of the 11 industries under the Hang Seng Industry Classification System
- It is the first A-share index that adopts both market capitalisation and fundamental factors such as revenues and net profits as the constituent stocks selection criteria
- Up to a maximum of five companies are selected from each industry
- It has a more balanced industry distribution and offers a more diversified exposure to the A-share market
- Stocks are freefloat-adjusted with a 10% cap on each constituent

== See also ==
- Hang Seng Index
- Hang Seng Composite Index
