= Xinyi =

Xinyi is an atonal pinyin romanization of various Mandarin Chinese words. It may refer to:

== Clothing ==
- Xinyi (clothing) (心衣), a form of undershirt worn during the Han era

== Places ==
=== Mainland China ===
- Xinyi, Jiangsu (新沂市), a county-level city in Xuzhou, Jiangsu
  - Xinyi railway station (新沂站)
- Xinyi, Guangdong (信宜市), a county-level city in Maoming, Guangdong
- Xinyi Subdistrict, Harbin (新一街道), subdivision of Daowai District, Harbin, Heilongjiang
- Xinyi Subdistrict, Hegang (新一街道), subdivision of Dongshan District, Hegang, Heilongjiang
- Xinyi Subdistrict, Xiaoyi (新义街道), subdivision of Xiaoyi, Shanxi
- Xinyi, Shandong (新驿镇), town in and subdivision of Yanzhou District, Jining, Shandong
- Xinyi, Lishi District (信义镇), town in and subdivision of Lishi District, Lüliang, Shanxi

=== Taiwan ===
- Xinyi, Nantou (信義鄉), township of Nantou County
- Xinyi Anhe metro station (信義安和站), Da'an District, Taipei
- Xinyi District, Taipei (信義區)
- Xinyi District, Keelung (信義區)
- Xinyi Expressway (信義快速道路), Wenshan-Xinyi, Taipei
- Xinyi line (信義線), a metro branch line of Tamsui–Xinyi line
- Sinyi Elementary School metro station (信義國小站), Sinsing District, Kaohsiung

== People ==
- Chen Xinyi (Chinese: 陈欣怡) (b. 1998), a swimmer
- Joyce Cheng Yan-yee (Xinyi) (Chinese: 鄭欣宜) (b. 1987), a singer and actress
- Ding Xinyi (b. 2004), a rhythmic gymnast
- Fan Xinyi (b. 2002), a trampoline gymnast
- Li Xinyi (singer) (Chinese: 李鑫一) (b. 1998), a singer
- Li Xinyi (tennis) (b. 1962), a tennis player
- Lara Veronin or Liang Xinyi (Chinese: 梁心頤) (b. 1988), a singer
- Ma Xinyi (Chinese: 馬新貽) (1821–1870), an official and military general
- Pei Xinyi (Chinese: 裴鑫依) (b. 2005), a world champion weightlifter
- Qiu Xinyi (Chinese: 邱欣怡) (b. 1997), a singer
- Wang Xinyi (b. 2003), a swimmer
- Xinyi Cheng (Chinese: 程心怡) (b. 1989), a painter
- Xia Xinyi (b. 1997), an Olympic beach volleyball player
- Xinyi Xu, a statistician
- Xinyi Yuan (Chinese: 袁新意) (b. 1981), a mathematician
- Yuen Shun-yi (Yuan Xinyi) (Chinese: 袁信義), a martial artist, actor, and stuntperson

== Companies ==
- Xinyi Glass (信义玻璃控股有限公司), a glass manufacturer
  - Xinyi Solar (信义光能控股有限公司), an affiliate specializing in photovoltaics

== Other ==
- Magnolia biondii (辛夷), used in traditional Chinese medicine
- Xinyi, a martial art that was a precursor to xingyiquan

== See also ==
- 信義 (disambiguation)
