= FGG =

FGG may refer to:

- Fairfield Greenwich Group, an American investment firm
- Federation of Gay Games
- Fibrinogen gamma chain
- Flat Glass Group, a Chinese glass production company
- Forensic genetic genealogy
- Foundation for God's Glory, an American charity
- "FGG", a song by Susumu Hirasawa from The Ghost in Science
