= Ho Sin Hang =

Hong Kong banker and philanthropist

Ho Sin Hang 何善衡
- Born: 1900; Panyu, Guangdong, Qing Empire
- Died: 4 December 1997 (aged 97); Hong Kong
- Other names: S. H. Ho; He Shanheng
- Occupations: Entrepreneur, Investor
- Board member of: Hang Seng Bank, Dah Chong Hong, Hang Chong Investment Co., New World Development, Wing Lung Bank, Furama Hotel Enterprises, Miramar Hotel and Investment

Ho Sin Hang (Chinese: 何善衡; pinyin: Hé Shànhéng; Jyutping: ho4 sin6 hang4; 1900 – 4 December 1997), also known as S. H. Ho and He Shanheng, was a Hong Kong entrepreneur, philanthropist and financier. He co-founded Hang Seng Bank in 1933, and served as its chairman. Ho also cofounded the Hang Chong Investment Co Ltd. and Dah Chong Hong Ltd., and was the first chairman of New World Development Company.

Ho was a renowned philanthropist. In 1970 he founded the S.H. Ho Foundation to support charitable causes. Many buildings and institutions in Hong Kong and China bear his name, including the S.H. Ho College of the Chinese University of Hong Kong and the Ho Sin Hang Campus of Hong Kong Baptist University. Owing to childhood poverty, Ho received little formal education, and education became the main focus of his charitable endeavours. He was one of the four founders of the Ho Leung Ho Lee Foundation.

== Early life ==
Ho Sin Hang was born in 1900 in Panyu, Guangdong, southern China. Due to poverty he only received a few years of education and began working at the age of 14. He worked in a salt warehouse for two years before taking up a position as an apprentice in a goldsmith's shop.

== Career ==
Ho completed his apprenticeship and was promoted to assistant manager at age 22. Two years later he resigned from his position to set up a trading business in Guangzhou. In 1933, Ho co-founded Hang Seng Ngan Ho with three partners, Lam Bing Yim (林炳炎), Sheng Tsun Lin (盛春霖) and Leung Chik Wai (梁植偉). Hang Seng began as a small currency changing booth on Wing Lok Street in Sheung Wan. Lam, the main shareholder, managed the firm's business in Shanghai and Ho managed its Guangzhou branch. After the outbreak of the Second Sino-Japanese War in 1937, Shanghai and Guangzhou were occupied by the Japanese, but Hang Seng initially made substantial profits by facilitating the foreign exchange needs of the Republic of China. In December 1941, Hong Kong also fell to the Japanese and Hang Seng was forced to close. Ho moved to Macau, which, as a Portuguese colony, remained neutral throughout the war, and continued the business as Wing Wah Ngan Ho. After the surrender of Japan in 1945, Ho revived Hang Seng, which became a leader of Chinese-owned banks in Hong Kong.

In 1952, Hang Seng Ngan Ho was incorporated and in 1959, was renamed Hang Seng Bank Ltd. From 1960 until 1983, he served as Chairman of the Bank, guiding the bank through its IPO in 1960 and its sale to HSBC in 1965 when the bank suffered a run on its deposits. In 1983, on the 50th anniversary of the Bank, Ho was named Hang Seng's Honorary chairman for the remainder of his life. Ho later co-founded Dah Chong Hong Ltd and the Hang Chong Investment Co Ltd.

Ho co-founded New World Development company in 1970 with Chow Chi Yuen. He served as the company's first chairman while Chow acted as Director and general manager. Ho also served as a director of Wing Lung Bank as well as Bangkok Mercantile Company. His other directorships included the Miramar and Furama hotels and he had business interests in the shipping and insurance industries. Ho also served as the Chairman of the Gold & Silver Exchange Society of Hong Kong.

=== Hang Seng Index ===
Ho conceived the idea of creating the Hang Seng Index as the "Dow Jones Industrial Average of Hong Kong". Along with Hang Seng Director Lee Quo-wei, he commissioned Hang Seng's head of Research Stanley Kwan to create the index, which is now globally recognised as the leading benchmark for the Hong Kong stock market.

== Philanthropy ==
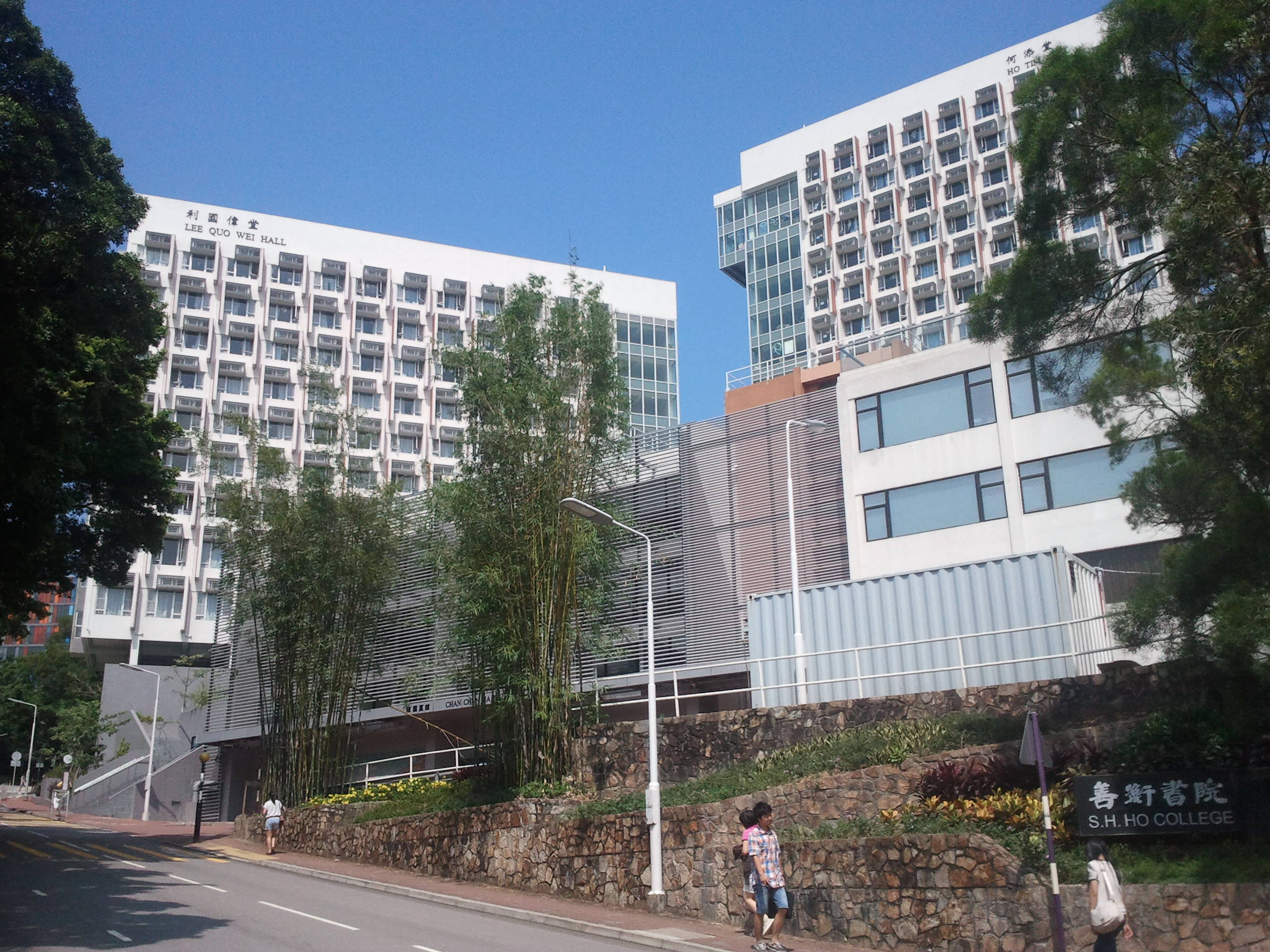
S.H. Ho College, Chinese University of Hong Kong

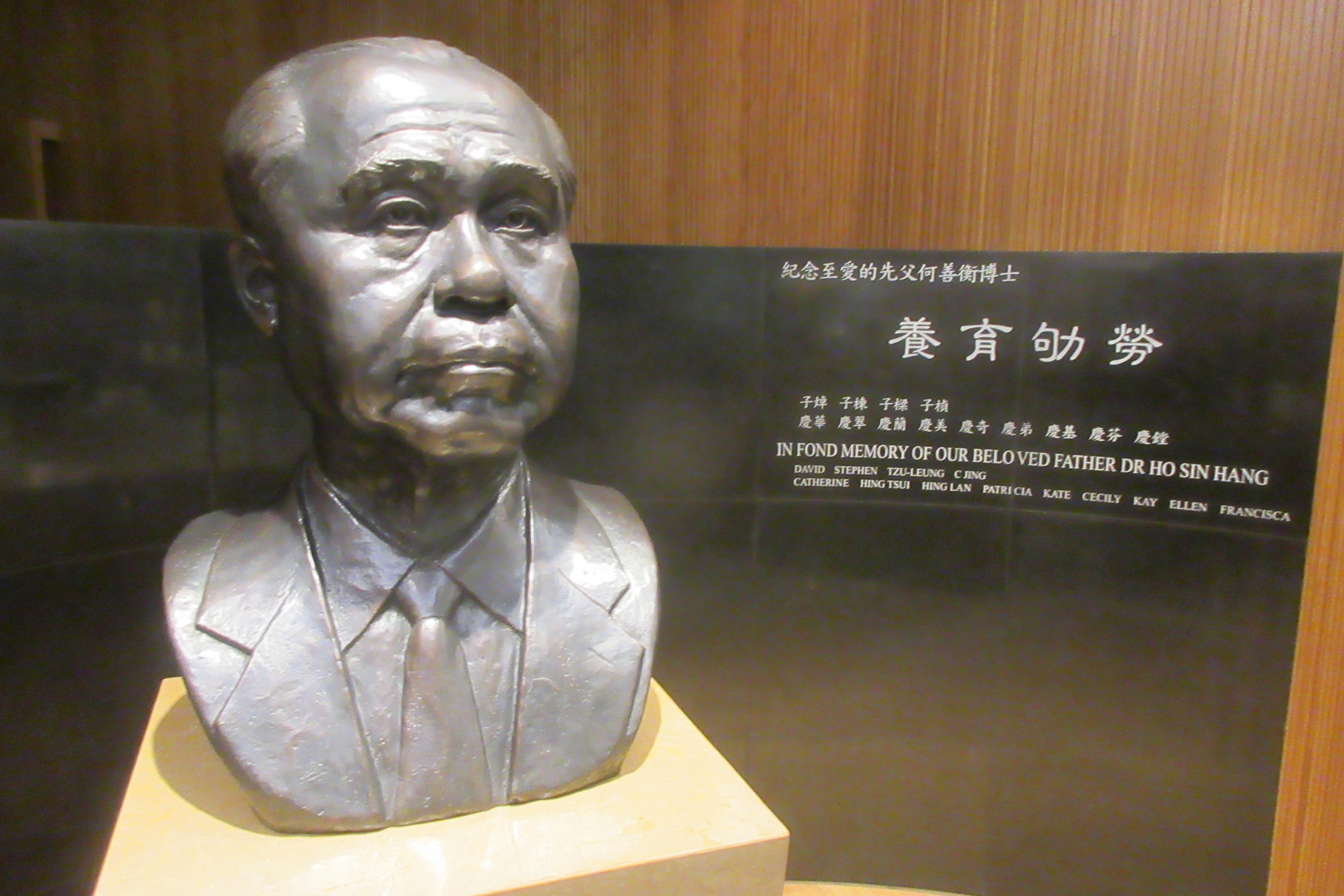

Ho was the founder and director of several middle and primary schools, donating many scholarships. In 1970, he founded the S. H. Ho Foundation to support charitable causes in China and overseas, including regional construction, education, medical services, scientific research and the training of new talent. In 1974, he founded the Hang Seng School of Commerce.

In 1980, following the reform and opening up of mainland China, Ho found his former employee Chen Zhenxia (陳震夏) in Shanghai. Chen had kept HK$10,000 in Ho's trust when the two lost contact in 1949 due to the Communist takeover of China. After three decades of Ho's management, the value of the funds had risen to $120 million. Following Ho's advice, Chen used two-thirds of the windfall to establish the Huaxia Foundation dedicated to the cause of education and health in China and Hong Kong. Ho also donated HK$20 million to help establish the business school of Zhongshan University in Guangzhou.

== Death ==
Ho died in Hong Kong on 4 December 1997 at the age of 97.

== Honours ==
Ho was named as an Officer of the Order of the British Empire in 1978. He was also honoured by the Thai and Japanese governments for his services to trade and commerce. In 1971 he was given the degree of Doctor of Social Sciences by the Chinese University of Hong Kong. In 1983 he was conferred the Doctor of Laws by the University of Hong Kong. In 1990, he became an Honorary Adviser to Zhongshan University and was conferred the Honorary Doctorates degree by that university in 1995.
