= Han Zhanwen =

Chinese astrophysicist

- 韩占文
- Born: 1965 (age 60–61); Shunping County, Hebei, China
- Education: Hebei University; University of Cambridge; University of Science and Technology of China
- Scientific career
- Fields: Astrophysics
- Workplaces: Yunnan Astronomical Observatory

Han Zhanwen (simplified Chinese: 韩占文; traditional Chinese: 韓占文; pinyin: Hán Zhànwén; born 1965) is a Chinese astrophysicist.

== Biography ==
Han was born in 1965 in Shunping County, Hebei. He completed his bachelor's degree from Hebei University in 1984 and earned a master's degree from Yunnan Astronomical Observatory in 1987. After that, he continued his study at the University of Cambridge in the United Kingdom and got his doctor's degree in 1995. He did post-doctoral research at the University of Science and Technology of China in Hefei.

On August 3, 2012, he was appointed director of Yunnan Astronomical Observatory.

Han was elected a member of the Chinese Academy of Sciences on November 28, 2017.

In 2018 he became an Associate Editor of the Journal Astronomy & Astrophysics.

== Awards ==
- 2016 Ho Leung Ho Lee Prize for Science and Technology.
