= Stanley Kwan (banker) =

Hong kong banker (1925–2011)

Stanley Shih Kuang Kwan (Chinese: 關士光; pinyin: Guān Shìguāng; January 10, 1925 – December 31, 2011) was a Hong Kong banker best known for creating the Hang Seng Index. The Hang Sang Index opened on November 24, 1969.

== Biography ==
Stanley S. K. Kwan was born in Hong Kong in 1925 into a traditional Chinese banking family. He attended King's College until the fall of Hong Kong in 1941 and joined the Chinese army as an interpreter for US forces during the war. From 1962 until he retired in 1984, he headed the Research Department in Hang Seng Bank. He launched the Hang Seng Index in 1969, served on the government's Statistics Advisory Board during 1976–84 and was awarded the MBE in 1985. He now lives in Toronto, Canada.

Kwan creation, the Hang Seng Index, has been widely used to measure the health and growth of the Hong Kong Stock Exchange. In 2008, Kwan published his memoirs, The Dragon and the Crown: Hong Kong Memoirs. In the book's foreword, written by Robert Neild, the President of the Hong Kong chapter of the Royal Asiatic Society, Neild calls the Hang Seng, "the ultimate capitalist measure of Hong Kong." As of 2012, the Hang Seng Index consists of forty-eight companies incorporating some of the largest in Asia. These include PetroChina, which is Asia's largest company in terms of market value, and Industrial and Commercial Bank of China, the largest lender in the world based on market value.

Kwan launched his career within the Hong Kong banking industry following the end of the war. He joined the staff of Hang Seng Bank in 1962. In 1969, Hang Seng Bank chairman Ho Sin Hang and general manager Q.W. Lee decided that there should be a Hong Kong version of New York's Dow Jones Industrial Average. Kwan headed the Hang Seng Bank's research department at the time. Together with his staff of seven employees, Kwan created the Hang Seng Index using input from economists, statisticians and government officials. The Index debuted in Hong Kong on November 24, 1969.

The Hang Seng Index would benefit, or suffer, based on the political and economic fortunes of Hong Kong. The Index crashed in 1974 following the 1973 oil crisis, and again in 1983, during a political stalemate in negotiations between China and the United Kingdom over the future status of Hong Kong. The Index grew following the transfer of sovereignty over Hong Kong in 1997, when mainland Chinese markets were opened to Hong Kong business interests.

Stanley Kwan retired from the banking industry and moved to Canada. He died in Toronto on December 31, 2011, at the age of 86.
