= 恒大 =

恒大 (pinyin: Héngdà; Cantonese Yale: Hàhngdaai) may refer to:

- Evergrande Group (Chinese: 恒大集团), a property developer in China
- Guangzhou Evergrande Taobao F.C. (Chinese: 广州恒大), a football club in China
- Hang Seng University of Hong Kong (Chinese: 恒生大學), a university in Hong Kong commonly abbreviated as 恒大
