= ENN Energy =

ENN Energy Holdings Limited
- Type: Public
- Traded as: Listed (SEHK: 2688)
- Industry: Utilities
- Headquarters: Langfang, China
- Key people: Chairman: Wang Yusuo
- Revenue: RMB60,698 million (2018)
- Parent: ENN Group
- Website: ir.ennenergy.com

ENN Energy Holdings Limited ("ENN Energy", formerly known as "XinAo Gas Holdings Limited") (SEHK: 2688) is a company listed on the Hong Kong Stock Exchange. It is one of the four listed companies owned by ENN Group, one of the largest private energy groups in China. The other three are ENN Ecological Holdings (Shanghai Stock Exchange: 600803), ENC Digital Technology Co., Ltd (Shanghai Stock Exchange: 603869) and Tibet Tourism Co., Ltd. (Shanghai Stock Exchange: 600749).

ENN Energy is one of the largest clean energy distributors in China. The principal business of the Group is the investment in, and the construction, operation and management of gas pipeline infrastructure, vehicle and ship refuelling stations and integrated energy projects, the sales and distribution of piped gas, LNG and other multi-energy products. The Group also conducts energy trading business and provides other services in relation to energy supply in the PRC. As of 31 December 2018, the Group had 187 project cities in China in 17 provinces, municipalities and autonomous regions, namely Anhui, Beijing, Fujian, Guangdong, Guangxi, Hebei, Henan, Hunan, Inner Mongolia, Jiangsu, Jiangxi, Liaoning, Sichuan, Shandong, Yunnan, Zhejiang and Shanxi, covering a connectable urban population of 94.57 million. The Group also developed 62 integrated energy projects in key regions spanning across 26 provinces and municipalities.

ENN Energy is a constituent of the Hang Seng Composite LargeCap Index, the Hang Seng China Enterprises Index and the MSCI China Mid Cap Index. It is an eligible security for Shanghai-Hong Kong Connect and Shenzhen-Hong Kong Connect.

== Listing history ==
In May 2001, XinAo Gas was first listed on the Growth Enterprise Market (GEM) on the Hong Kong Stock Exchange with the stock code of 8159.HK. In June 2002 the Company transferred from GEM to the Main Board, with the new stock code of 2688.HK. On 22 September 2010, the firm was renamed as ENN Energy Holdings Limited.
