= Sin-e =

Sin-e may refer to:

- Xinyi, a former county and present county-level city in Guangdong, China
- Other places now romanized as Xinyi
- Sin-é, a defunct club in Manhattan, New York
