= Hang Seng China H-Financials Index =

Hang Seng China H-Financials Index (H-FIN) is one of the Hong Kong stock market indexes produced by the Hang Seng Indexes Company Limited. H-FIN was launched on 27 November 2006. It is used to reflect the performance of all China financial stocks listed in Hong Kong.

== Feature ==
Key features of H-FIN include the following:

- Stocks in this index are selected on the Hang Seng Industry Classification System
- Shows performance of China financial industry, which has a high weighting in H share stocks
- Stocks are freefloat-adjusted for invertibility representation
- A 10% cap is applied in calculation to avoid single stock domination

== Key information ==
- Launch date : 27 Nov 2006
- Backdated to : 5 Mar 2004
- Base date : 5 Mar 2004
- Base index : 5,033.14
- Review : Half-yearly
- Dissemination: Every 2 sec
- Currency : HKD
- No. of Constituents : 47

== See also ==
- Hang Seng Index
