= 信義 =

信義, 信义 or 신의 may refer to:

- Faith, South Korean television series
- Nobuyoshi, Japanese given name
- Xinyi, Chinese transliterated
