= Ho Leung Ho Lee Foundation =

Hong Kong non-government organisation

The Ho Leung Ho Lee Foundation (HLHL, Chinese: 何梁何利基金) is a Hong Kong–based non-government organisation which annually bestows prizes upon Chinese scientists. It was established on 30 March 1994, with funds donated from the charitable foundations of Ho Sin Hang (He Shanheng), Leung Kau-Kui (梁銶琚, Liang Qiuju), Ho Tim (何添, He Tian), and Lee Quo-wei (Li Guowei).

== Foundation awards ==
- Science and Technology Achievement Award
- Science and Technology Progress Award
- Science and Technology Innovation Award

Past winners of awards includes:

- Han Zhanwen 2016
- Ma Weiming 2015
