= Hang Seng Index =

Stock market index in Hong Kong

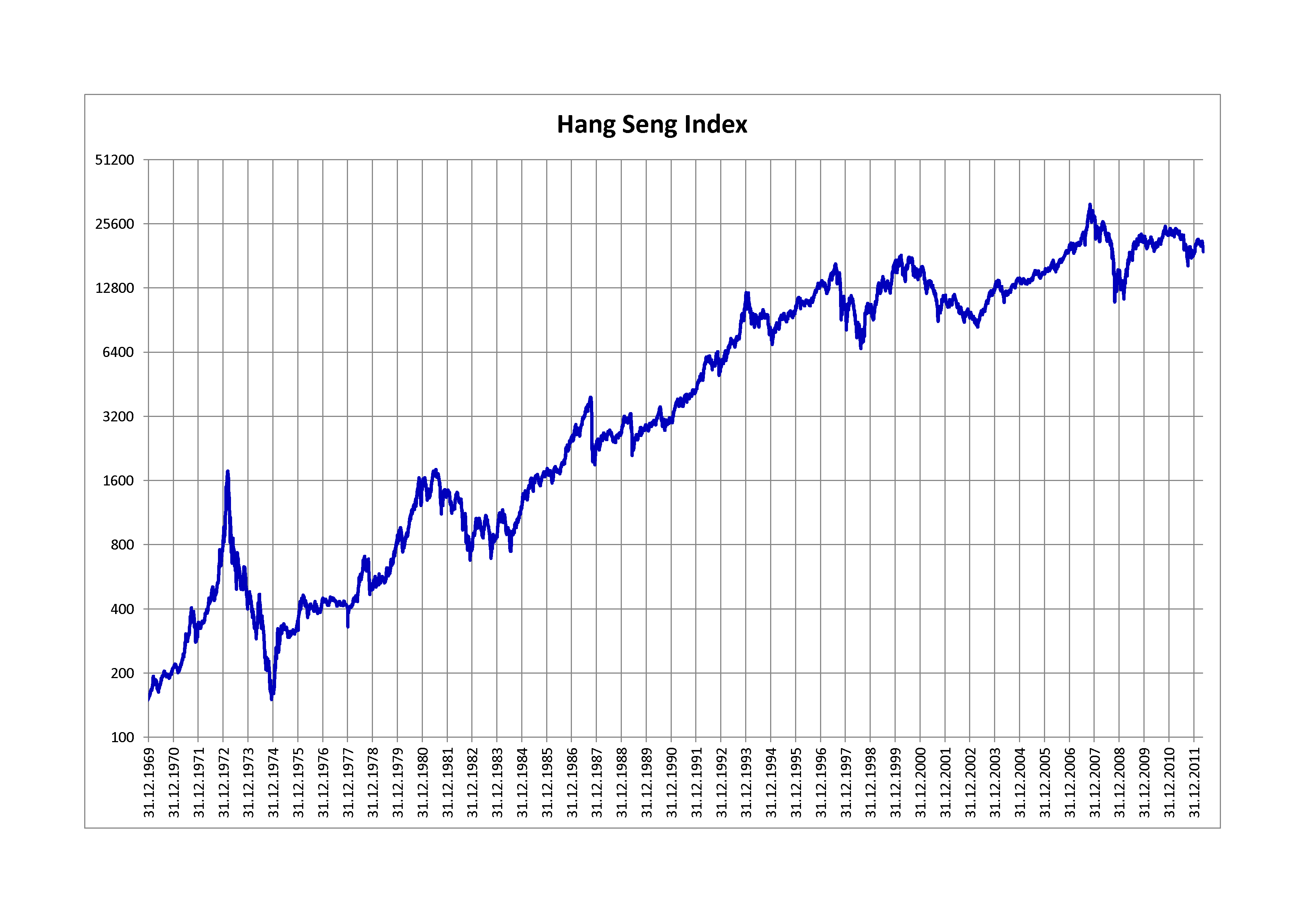
- Historical logarithmic graph of the Hang Seng Index from 1969 to 2012.
- Foundation: July 31, 1964; 62 years ago
- Operator: Hang Seng Indexes Company
- Exchanges: Hong Kong Stock Exchange
- Trading symbol: HSI
- Constituents: 88
- Weighting method: Capitalisation-weighted
- Website: hsi.com.hk

Hang Seng Index
- Traditional Chinese: 恒生指數
- Simplified Chinese: 恒生指数
- Literal meaning: ever-growing index
Transcriptions
Standard Mandarin
- Hanyu Pinyin: Héng Shēng zhǐshù
- Wade–Giles: Heng Sheng chihshu
- Yale Romanization: Héng Shēng jřshù
- IPA: [xə̌ŋ ʂə́ŋʈʂɻ̩̀ʂû]
Yue: Cantonese
- Yale Romanization: Hàhng sāng jí sóu
- Jyutping: Hang4 sang1 zi2 sou3
- IPA: [hɐ̏ŋ sɐ́ːŋ tɕǐːsǒu]

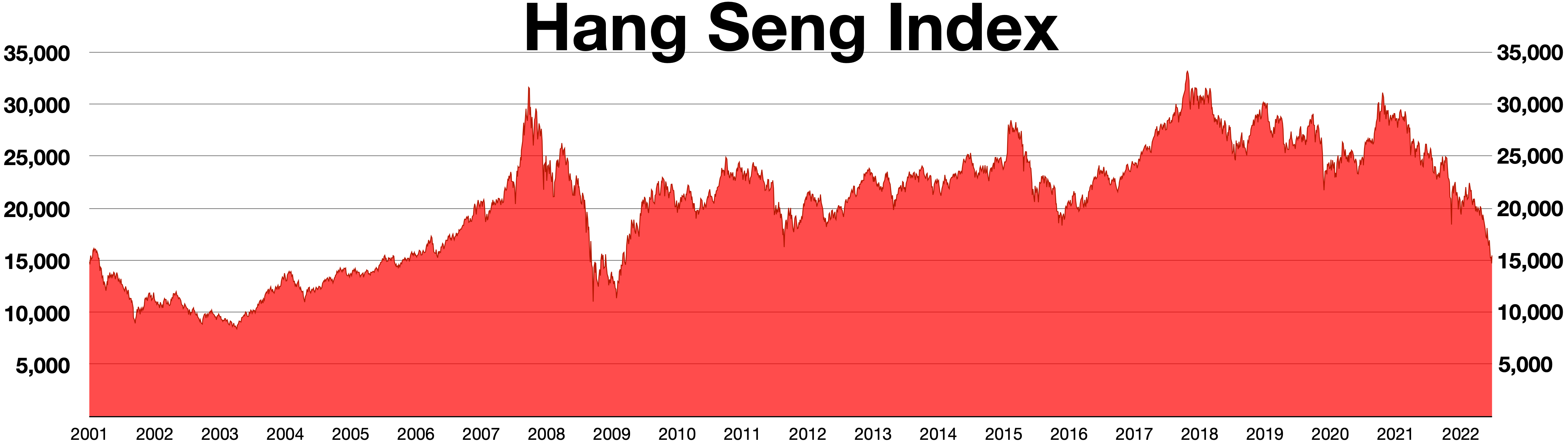
Hang Seng Index 2001–2022

The Hang Seng Index (HSI) is a market-capitalisation-weighted stock market index in Hong Kong adjusted for free float. It tracks and records daily changes in the largest stock listings on the Stock Exchange of Hong Kong (SEHK) and serves as the primary indicator of overall market performance in Hong Kong. These 88 constituent companies represent about 58% of the capitalisation of the SEHK.

HSI was publicized on November 24, 1969, and is currently compiled and maintained by Hang Seng Indexes Company Limited, which is a wholly owned subsidiary of Hang Seng Bank, one of the largest banks in Hong Kong in terms of market capitalisation. It is responsible for compiling, publishing and managing the Hang Seng Index and a range of other stock indexes, such as Hang Seng China Enterprises Index, Hang Seng China AH Index Series, Hang Seng China H-Financials Index, Hang Seng Composite Index Series, Hang Seng China A Industry Top Index, Hang Seng Corporate Sustainability Index Series and Hang Seng Total Return Index Series. Hang Seng Bank, in turn, is an indirectly wholly owned subsidiary of another listed international financial institution HSBC Holdings plc, owned through its Hong Kong subsidiary. (Note: Hang Seng Bank was a public company and a constituent of the index until January 2026, when HSBC, its majority shareholder, privatise it and took it off the SEHK.)

== History ==
Ho Sin Hang, founding chairman of the Hang Seng Bank, conceived the idea of creating the Hang Seng Index as a "Dow Jones Index for Hong Kong". Along with Hang Seng Director Lee Quo-wei, he commissioned Hang Seng's head of Research Stanley Kwan to create the index in 1964, the index was initially used for internal reference in the Hang Seng Bank, they debuted the index on November 24, 1969.

== Investing in the Hang Seng Index ==
=== Mutual and exchange-traded funds ===
Index funds, including mutual funds and exchange-traded funds (ETFs), can replicate, before fees and expenses, the performance of the index by holding the same stocks as the index in the same proportions. ETFs that replicate the performance of the index are issued by Hang Seng Investment Management (Tracker Fund of Hong Kong, SEHK: 2800), CSOP Asset Management (SEHK: 3037), and iShares (SEHK: 3115).

CSOP Asset Management offers an inverse ETF (SEHK: 7300) that produces -1x daily return of the Hang Seng Index, as well as leveraged ETFs which attempt to produce 2x the daily return of either investing in (SEHK: 7200) or shorting (SEHK: 7500) the index.

=== Derivatives ===
In the derivatives market, the Hang Seng Index is traded as a futures contract on the Hong Kong Futures Exchange (HKFE). The full contract specifications are below:

Contract Specification
Hang Seng Index (HSI)	
Contract Size:	HK$50 Hang Seng Index Points
Exchange:	HKFE
Sector:	Index
Tick Size:	1
Tick Value:	50 HKD
Big Point Value (BPV):	50
Denomination:	HKD
Decimal Place:	0

== Statistics ==
When the Hang Seng Index was first published, its base of 100 points was set equivalent to the stocks' total value as of the market close on July 31, 1964. Its all-time low is 58.61 points, reached retroactively on August 31, 1967, after the base value was established but before the publication of the index. The Hang Seng passed the 10,000 point milestone for the first time in its history on December 10, 1993, and, 13 years later, passed the 20,000 point milestone on December 28, 2006. In less than 10 months, it passed the 30,000 point milestone on October 18, 2007. Its all-time high, set on January 26, 2018, was 33,223.58 points at closing. From October 30, 2007, through March 9, 2008, the index lost 9,426 points or approximately 30%. On September 5, it fell past the 20,000 mark the first time in almost a year to a low of 19,708.39, later closing at 19,933.28. On October 8, 2008, the index closed at 15,431.73, over 50% less than the all-time high and the lowest closing value in over two years. On October 27, 2008, the index further fell to 10,676.29 points, having fallen nearly two-thirds from its all-time peak, but passed the 20,000 point milestone again to 20,063.93 on 24 July 2009. The index reached 25,000.00 on August 19, 2014, reaching as high as 25,201.21 that day, later closing at 24,909.26 points. It continued rising to hit 26,000 on April 8, 2015, with a close of 26,236.86 The following day, it rose to as much as 27,922.67 before closing at 26,944.39. Yet again, another milestone was reached on April 13, 2015, rising to over 28,000 points, or closing to 28,016.34, the highest since December 2007. On July 8, 2015, the index fell as much as 2139 points. On 21 August the index entered a bear market. The index at that point hovered around 18000–19000 points, until it ended in February 2016. On 24 June 2016, the market fell 1,000 points in response to UK EU referendum results that "Leave" won the vote against "Remain". Then, the markets continuously fell on 27 and 28 June 2016 before recovered slightly on 29 June 2016.

=== Annual returns ===
The following table shows the annual development of the Hang Seng Index, which was calculated from 1964.

Year	Closing level	Change in Index in Points	Change in Index in %
1965	82.14		
1966	79.69	−2.45	−2.98
1967	66.92	−12.77	−16.02
1968	107.55	40.63	60.71
1969	155.47	47.92	44.56
1970	211.64	56.17	36.13
1971	341.36	129.72	61.29
1972	843.40	502.04	147.07
1973	433.68	−409.72	−48.58
1974	171.11	−262.57	−60.54
1975	350.00	178.89	104.55
1976	447.67	97.67	27.91
1977	404.02	−43.65	−9.75
1978	495.51	91.49	22.64
1979	879.38	383.87	77.47
1980	1,473.59	594.21	67.57
1981	1,405.82	−67.77	−4.60
1982	783.82	−622.00	−44.24
1983	874.94	91.12	11.63
1984	1,200.38	567.35	89.62
1985	1,752.45	552.07	45.99
1986	2,568.30	815.85	46.55
1987	2,302.75	−265.55	−10.34
1988	2,687.44	384.69	16.70
1989	2,836.57	149.13	5.55
1990	3,024.55	187.98	6.63
1991	4,297.33	1,272.78	42.08
1992	5,512.39	1,215.06	28.28
1993	11,888.39	6,376.00	115.67
1994	8,191.04	−3,697.40	−31.10
1995	10,073.39	1,882.35	22.98
1996	13,451.45	3,378.06	33.53
1997	10,722.76	−2,728.69	−20.29
1998	10,048.58	−674.18	−6.29
1999	16,962.10	6,913.52	68.80
2000	15,095.53	−1,866.57	−11.00
2001	11,397.21	−3,698.32	−24.50
2002	9,321.29	−2,075.92	−18.21
2003	12,575.94	3,254.65	34.92
2004	14,230.14	1,654.20	13.15
2005	14,876.43	646.29	4.54
2006	19,964.72	5,088.29	34.20
2007	27,812.65	7,847.93	39.31
2008	14,387.48	−13,425.17	−48.27
2009	21,872.50	7,485.02	52.02
2010	23,035.45	1,162.95	5.32
2011	18,434.39	−4,601.06	−19.97
2012	22,656.92	4,222.53	22.91
2013	23,306.39	649.47	2.87
2014	23,605.04	298.65	1.28
2015	21,914.40	−1,690.64	−7.16
2016	22,000.56	86.16	0.39
2017	29,919.15	7,918.59	35.99
2018	25,845.70	−4,073.45	−13.61
2019	28,189.75	2,344.05	9.07
2020	27,231.13	−958.62	−3.40
2021	23,397.67	−3,833.46	−14.08
2022	19,781.41	−3,616.26	−15.46
2023	17,047.39	−2,734.02	−13.82
2024	20,059.95	3,012.56	17.67
2025	25,630.54	5,570.59	27.77

== Components ==
On January 2, 1985, four sub-indices were established in order to make the index clearer and to classify constituent stocks into four distinct sectors. There are 88 HSI constituent stocks in total. As of January 2026 they are:

Ticker	Name	Sub-index
SEHK: 5	HSBC Holdings plc	Finance
SEHK: 388	HKEx Limited	Finance
SEHK: 939	China Construction Bank	Finance
SEHK: 1299	AIA Group Limited	Finance
SEHK: 1398	Industrial and Commercial Bank of China	Finance
SEHK: 2318	Ping An Insurance	Finance
SEHK: 2388	BOC Hong Kong (Holdings) Ltd	Finance
SEHK: 2628	China Life	Finance
SEHK: 3968	China Merchants Bank	Finance
SEHK: 3988	Bank of China Ltd	Finance
SEHK: 2	CLP Holdings Limited	Utilities
SEHK: 3	Hong Kong and China Gas Company Limited	Utilities
SEHK: 6	Power Assets Holdings Limited	Utilities
SEHK: 836	China Resources Power	Utilities
SEHK: 1038	Cheung Kong Infrastructure Holdings Limited	Utilities
SEHK: 2688	ENN Energy	Utilities
SEHK: 12	Henderson Land Development Company Limited	Properties
SEHK: 16	Sun Hung Kai Properties Limited	Properties
SEHK: 101	Hang Lung Properties Limited	Properties
SEHK: 688	China Overseas Land & Investment Limited	Properties
SEHK: 823	Link REIT	Properties
SEHK: 960	Longfor Properties	Properties
SEHK: 1109	China Resources Land Limited	Properties
SEHK: 1113	CK Asset Holdings	Properties
SEHK: 1209	China Resources Mixc Lifestyle	Properties
SEHK: 1997	Wharf Real Estate Investment Company Limited	Properties
SEHK: 1	CK Hutchison Holdings Limited	Commerce & Industry
SEHK: 27	Galaxy Entertainment Group Ltd.	Commerce & Industry
SEHK: 66	MTR Corporation Ltd	Commerce & Industry
SEHK: 175	Geely Auto	Commerce & Industry
SEHK: 241	Alibaba Health	Commerce & Industry
SEHK: 267	CITIC Limited	Commerce & Industry
SEHK: 285	BYD Electronics	Commerce & Industry
SEHK: 288	WH Group	Commerce & Industry
SEHK: 291	China Resources Beer	Commerce & Industry
SEHK: 300	Midea Group	Commerce & Industry
SEHK: 316	Orient Overseas (International) Limited	Commerce & Industry
SEHK: 322	Tingyi	Commerce & Industry
SEHK: 386	Sinopec Corp	Commerce & Industry
SEHK: 669	Techtronic Industries	Commerce & Industry
SEHK: 700	Tencent Holdings Limited	Commerce & Industry
SEHK: 762	China Unicom	Commerce & Industry
SEHK: 857	PetroChina Company Limited	Commerce & Industry
SEHK: 868	Xinyi Glass	Commerce & Industry
SEHK: 881	Zhongsheng Group	Commerce & Industry
SEHK: 883	CNOOC Limited	Commerce & Industry
SEHK: 941	China Mobile Ltd	Commerce & Industry
SEHK: 968	Xinyi Solar	Commerce & Industry
SEHK: 981	Semiconductor Manufacturing International Corporation	Commerce & Industry
SEHK: 992	Lenovo	Commerce & Industry
SEHK: 1024	Kuaishou	Commerce & Industry
SEHK: 1044	Hengan International Group Co. Ltd	Commerce & Industry
SEHK: 1088	China Shenhua Energy	Commerce & Industry
SEHK: 1093	CSPC Pharmaceutical Group	Commerce & Industry
SEHK: 1099	Sinopharm Group	Commerce & Industry
SEHK: 1177	Sino Biopharm	Commerce & Industry
SEHK: 1211	BYD Company	Commerce & Industry
SEHK: 1378	China Hongqiao Group	Commerce & Industry
SEHK: 1810	Xiaomi	Commerce & Industry
SEHK: 1876	Budweiser Brewing Company APAC	Commerce & Industry
SEHK: 1928	Sands China	Commerce & Industry
SEHK: 1929	Chow Tai Fook	Commerce & Industry
SEHK: 2015	Li Auto	Commerce & Industry
SEHK: 2020	Anta Sports	Commerce & Industry
SEHK: 2057	ZTO Express	Commerce & Industry
SEHK: 2269	WuXi Biologics	Commerce & Industry
SEHK: 2313	Shenzhou International	Commerce & Industry
SEHK: 2319	Mengniu Dairy	Commerce & Industry
SEHK: 2331	Li-Ning	Commerce & Industry
SEHK: 2359	WuXi AppTec	Commerce & Industry
SEHK: 2382	Sunny Optical	Commerce & Industry
SEHK: 2618	JD Logistics	Commerce & Industry
SEHK: 2899	Zijin Mining	Commerce & Industry
SEHK: 3690	Meituan	Commerce & Industry
SEHK: 3692	Hansoh Pharmaceutical Group	Commerce & Industry
SEHK: 6618	JD Health	Commerce & Industry
SEHK: 6690	Haier	Commerce & Industry
SEHK: 6862	Haidilao	Commerce & Industry
SEHK: 9618	JD.com	Commerce & Industry
SEHK: 9633	Nongfu Spring	Commerce & Industry
SEHK: 9888	Baidu	Commerce & Industry
SEHK: 9961	Trip.com Group	Commerce & Industry
SEHK: 9988	Alibaba Group	Commerce & Industry
SEHK: 9992	Pop Mart	Commerce & Industry
SEHK: 9999	NetEase	Commerce & Industry

== See also ==
- Dow Jones Industrial Average
- Nikkei 225
- SSE Composite Index
- SZSE Component Index
- FTSE China A50 Index
