= Lee Yin Yee =

Chinese billionaire businessman

- 李贤义
- Born: 1952 (age 73–74)
- Relatives: Yan Zi, Anne Xiaoyan Zhang (daughter-in-law)

Lee Yin Yee (李贤义; Lǐ Xiányì; born 1952) is a Chinese billionaire and businessman, the founder and chairman of Xinyi Glass and Xinyi Solar.

Lee made the 2022 Forbes Billionaires List with an estimated wealth of $4.2 billion and occupied the 687th position. He is the main shareholder of the Xinyi Glass.

His son Lee Shing Put is married to the daughter of former Chinese vice-premier Zhang Gaoli.
