= Xinyi Solar =

Chinese solar company

Xinyi Solar Holdings Limited
- Native name: 信义光能控股有限公司 (Chinese)
- Type: Civilian-run enterprise Publicly traded company
- Traded as: SEHK: 968
- Founded: 2008
- Headquarters: Xinyi Glass Industrial Park, 2 Xinyi Road, Economic and Technological Development Zone, Wuhu, Anhui, China
- Key people: Chair: Lee Yin Yee
- Revenue: 9.527 billion HKD (2017)
- Net income: 2.332 billion HKD (2017)

Chinese name
- Simplified Chinese: 信义光能控股有限公司
- Traditional Chinese: 信義光能控股有限公司
Transcriptions
Standard Mandarin
- Hanyu Pinyin: Xìnyì Guāngnéng Kònggǔ Yǒuxiàn Gōngsī
- Website: www.xinyisolar.com

Xinyi Solar Holdings Limited (SEHK: 968) was formed in 2008 in Dongguan when Xinyi Glass split off its solar photovoltaic glass development, manufacturing, sale, and customer service. It is the largest solar cover glass producer in the world and has a 30% market share, according to JP Morgan Asia Pacific Equity Research. Xinyi Solar's chair is Lee Yin Yee. About 23% of the company is owned by Xinyi Glass.

It was listed on the Hong Kong Stock Exchange in December 2013. Its subsidiary Xinyi Energy, which operates solar farms, also had an IPO on the Hong Kong Stock Exchange in May 2019, with sponsor BNP Paribas SA and cornerstone investors Law Kar-po and Ma Jianrong.

In 2017, the company earned 9.527 billion HKD in revenue, an increase of 58.6% over the previous year, and a profit of 2.332 billion HKD, a 17.4% increase over the previous year.

In June 2021 Xinyi Solar was added to the Hang Seng Index. In February 2022, it was added to the Hang Seng China Enterprises Index. Xinyi Solar was also chosen by Goldman Sachs as one of 50 stocks likely to benefit from the common prosperity drive.

In 2022, the company announced plans to sell A shares on the Shenzhen Stock Exchange, saying that there was more of an opportunity to obtain large-scale investments there than in Hong Kong and that a listing in Shenzhen would make it easier to compare Xinyi Solar's value with other Chinese solar companies.

Xinyi Solar has said that the Chinese government's carbon-neutral goals have increased demand for photovoltaic glass, which is good for its business. This sentiment is echoed by investment manager Ken Xu, who expressed optimism about the company's future for the same reason in December 2021, even though Xinyi Solar was at that point one of the worst-performing components of the Hang Seng Index for the year. United States government sanctions against solar products from Xinjiang over alleged human rights abuses have had mixed effects: the company's share price rose in June 2021, on the assumption that sanctions would adversely affect its competitors, but the share price sank in December 2021, as Xinyi Solar does some of its manufacturing in Xinjiang.

== See also ==
- Photovoltaics
- Flat Glass Group
