= CSPC Zhongrun =

Chinese pharmaceutical company

Hebei Zhongrun Pharmaceutical Co., Ltd (CSPC Zhongrun) (simplified Chinese: 石药集团河北中润制药有限公司; traditional Chinese: 石藥集團河北中潤制藥有限公司; pinyin: Shíyào jítuán héběi zhōngrùn zhìyào yǒuxiàn gōngsī) is one of China's largest producers of bulk antibiotic active pharmaceutical ingredients. CSPC Zhongrun produces both penicillin and cephalosporin series API.

A joint venture established in 1989 by China Pharmaceutical Group Ltd (CHINA PHARMA, SEHK: 1093), CSPC Zhongrun employs more than 3,600 workers.

CSPC Zhongrun penicillin and cephalosporin Beta-lactam antibiotic products include 16 varieties of API and intermediates. The penicillin series includes penicillin G potassium crude, penicillin G potassium, penicillin G sodium, 6-APA, amoxicillin trihydrate, ampicillin trihydrate and ampicillin sodium.

The cephalosporin series includes intermediate 7-ACA, cefazolin sodium, cefazolin acid and ceftriaxone sodium. Meropenem API is also produced.
