= Gaoyupu =

Gaoyupu 高于铺镇
- Town
- Gāoyúpū Zhèn
- Location in Hebei Location in China
- Coordinates: 38°45′09″N 115°12′46″E
- Country: People's Republic of China
- Province: Hebei
- Prefecture-level city: Baoding
- County: Shunping

Area
  - Total: 67.63 km^{2} (26.11 sq mi)

Population (2010)
  - Total: 51,423
  - Density: 760.4/km^{2} (1,969/sq mi)
- Time zone: UTC+8 (China Standard)

Gaoyupu (Chinese: 高于铺镇; pinyin: Gāoyúpū Zhèn) is a town located in Shunping County, Baoding, Hebei, China. According to the 2010 census, Gaoyupu had a population of 51,423, including 25,848 males and 25,575 females. The population was distributed as follows: 9,629 people aged under 14, 37,743 people aged between 15 and 64, and 4,051 people aged over 65.

== See also ==
- List of township-level divisions of Hebei
