= Flat Glass Group =

Chinese glass manufacturer

Flat Glass Group Co., Ltd.
- Native name: 福莱特玻璃集团股份有限公司
- Formerly: Naibang Trading
- Company type: Public
- Traded as: SEHK: 6865 (H Shares); SSE: 601865(A Shares)
- Industry: Glass production
- Founded: June 24, 1998; 27 years ago
- Founders: Ruan Hongliang
- Headquarters: Jiaxing, Zhejiang, China
- Key people: Ruan Hongliang (Chairman); Ruan Zeyun (President)
- Revenue: ▲CN¥21.52 billion (2023)
- Net income: ▲CN¥2.76 billion (2023)
- Total assets: ▲CN¥42.98 billion (2023)
- Total equity: ▲CN¥22.29 billion (2023)
- Number of employees: 8,240 (2023)
- Website: www.flatgroup.com.cn

Flat Glass Group (FGG; Chinese: 福莱特玻璃集团; pinyin: Fúláitè Bōlí Jítuán) is a publicly listed Chinese glass production company headquartered in Jiaxing, Zhejiang.

It is the world's second largest producers of photovoltaic (PV) glass used in solar power. In 2019, it had a daily capacity of 5,400 tonnes.

== Background ==
FGG was established originally as Naibang Trading on 24 June 1998 in Jiaxing, Zhejiang province. It was founded by Ruan Hongliang and several partners.

In June 2006, FGG expanded beyond the flat glass business and entered the PV glass industry with the establishment of the entity Shanghai Flat Glass. It had a capacity of 100 tons per day. Originally the business lost more than 200,00 each day but three months later, the products passed certifications needed to enter the European business. By 2012, PV glass accounted for 75% of FGG's revenue.

On 26 November 2015, FGG held its H share initial public offering (IPO) becoming a listed company on the Hong Kong Stock Exchange.

On 15 February 2019, FGG held its A Share secondary listing on the Shanghai Stock Exchange becoming a dual-listed company.

In June 2023, it was reported Saudi Arabia's Public Investment Fund had acquired over a 5% stake in FGG.

In October 2023, it was reported that FGG was the most shorted stock in Hong Kong. It was speculated that it had a poor future outlook due to the Chinese property sector crisis that would affect the construction business.

In November 2023, FGG stated it planned to invest US$290 million to build a PV glass plant in Indonesia to cut production costs and improve its overseas business positioning. It already had an overseas plant in Vietnam.

FGG's main rival is Xinyi Solar which is the largest PV glass producer in the world. Xinyi had split off from its parent Xinyi Glass in 2008 and held its IPO in 2013 which was earlier than FGG. As they entered the market early, both have a significant first-mover advantage over competitors.

== See also ==
- Photovoltaics
- Xinyi Solar
- Solar power in China
