= Rose Lee Wai Mun =

Rose Lee Wai Mun is an independent non-executive director of Swire She was the vice-chairman and chief executive officer of Hang Seng Bank.
