= Shunping County =

Shunping County 顺平县
- County
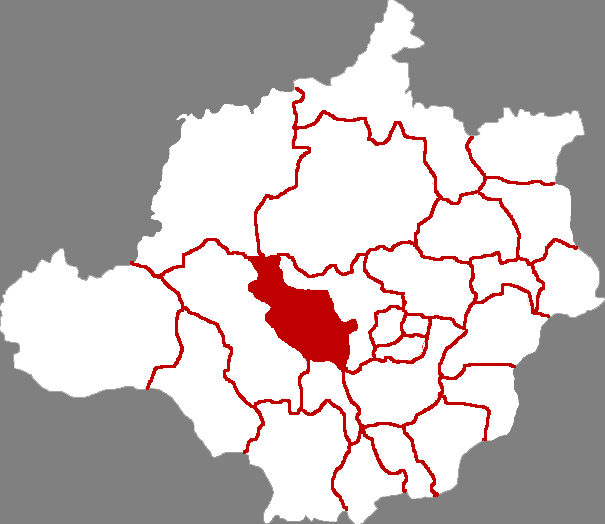
- Shunping in Baoding

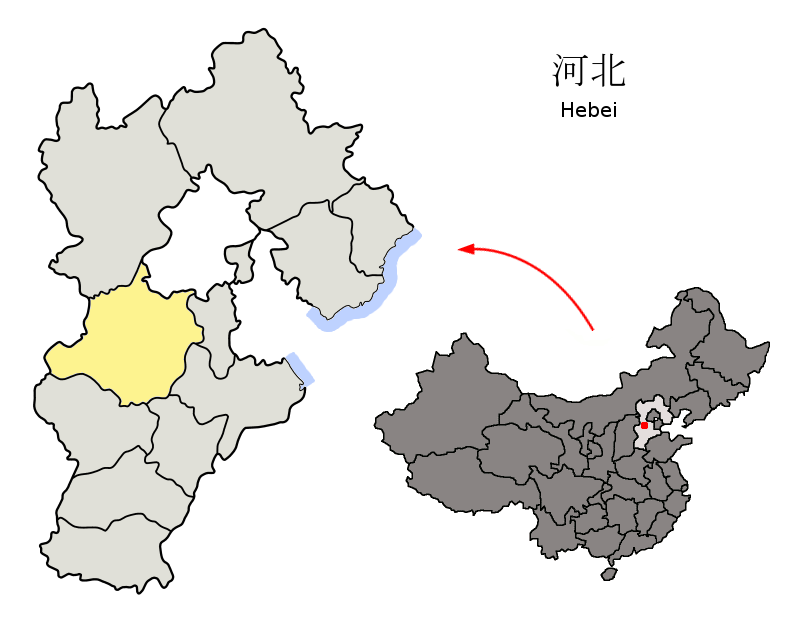
- Baoding in Hebei
- Coordinates: 38°50′13″N 115°08′06″E
- Country: People's Republic of China
- Province: Hebei
- Prefecture-level city: Baoding

Population (2020 census)
  - Total: 269,678
- Time zone: UTC+8 (China Standard)
- Website: www.shunping.gov.cn

Shunping County
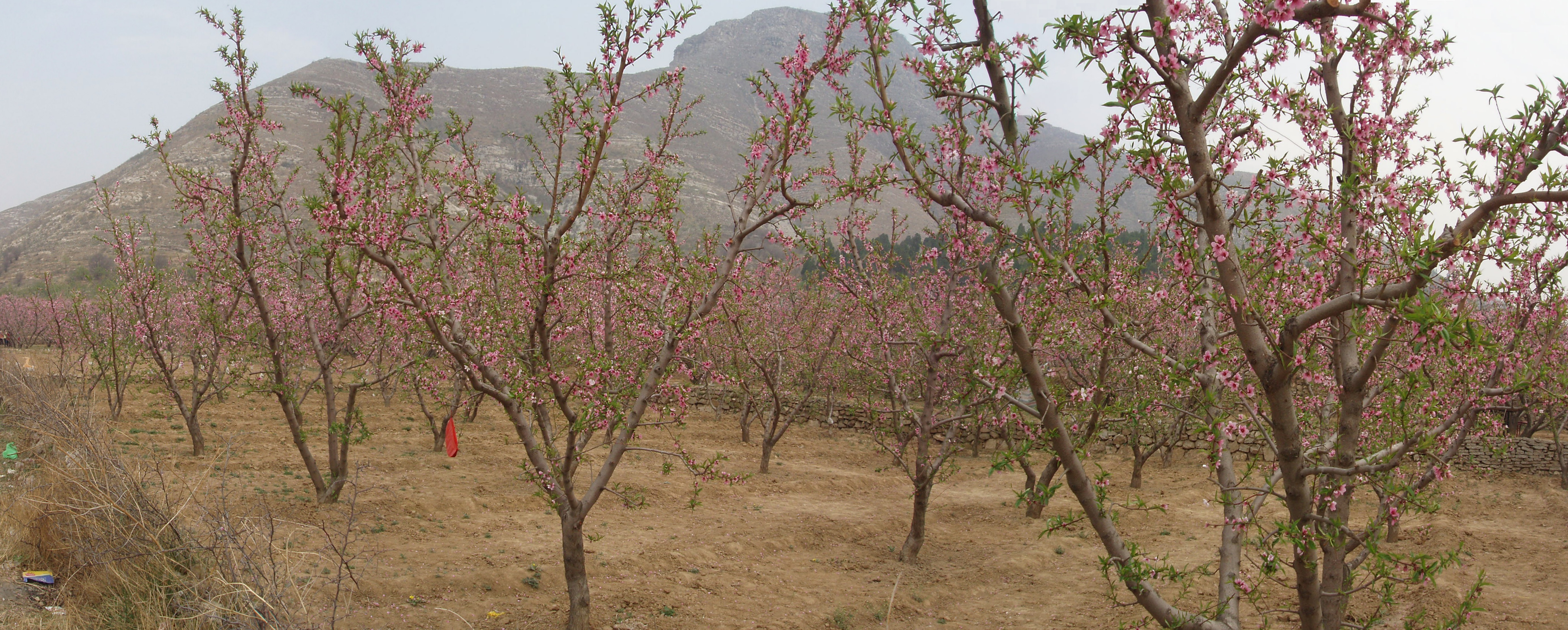
- Peach blossoms in Shunping County
- Traditional Chinese: 順平縣
- Simplified Chinese: 顺平县
Transcriptions
Standard Mandarin
- Hanyu Pinyin: Shùnpíng Xiàn
- Wade–Giles: Shun-p‘ing Hsien

Former names

Quni
- Chinese: 曲逆
Transcriptions
Standard Mandarin
- Hanyu Pinyin: Qūnì
- Wade–Giles: Ch‘ü-ni

Shunping County is a rural county in the west-central part of Hebei province, China. It is under the administration of the prefecture-level city of Baoding and lies to the west of its urban core.

== History ==
Under the Han, Shunping was known as Quni. It was a base for Chen Xi's general Wang Huang (t 王黃, s 王黄, Wáng Huáng) in his short-lived rebellion and the site of the defeat and executions of Wang and Hou Chang (侯敞, Hóu Chǎng) by Guan Ying and other imperial forces in 196 BC.

It was renamed Shunping under Wang Mang's short-lived Xin dynasty.

== Administrative divisions ==
Towns:

- Puyang (蒲阳镇), Gaoyupu (高于铺镇), Yaoshan (腰山镇)

Townships:

- Pushang Township (蒲上乡), Baiyun Township (白云乡), Hekou Township (河口乡), Anyang Township (安阳乡), Taiyu Township (台鱼乡), Dabei Township (大悲乡), Shennan Township (神南乡)

== Climate ==
Climate data for Shunping, elevation 81 m (266 ft), (1991–2020 normals, extremes 1981–2010)
Month	Jan	Feb	Mar	Apr	May	Jun	Jul	Aug	Sep	Oct	Nov	Dec	Year
Record high °C (°F)	16.9 (62.4)	23.0 (73.4)	30.8 (87.4)	33.0 (91.4)	37.9 (100.2)	40.7 (105.3)	41.4 (106.5)	35.9 (96.6)	34.4 (93.9)	31.9 (89.4)	24.1 (75.4)	19.4 (66.9)	41.4 (106.5)
Mean daily maximum °C (°F)	2.8 (37.0)	6.8 (44.2)	13.9 (57.0)	21.2 (70.2)	27.0 (80.6)	31.3 (88.3)	31.8 (89.2)	30.2 (86.4)	26.4 (79.5)	19.9 (67.8)	10.9 (51.6)	4.2 (39.6)	18.9 (66.0)
Daily mean °C (°F)	−3.5 (25.7)	0.4 (32.7)	7.6 (45.7)	15.1 (59.2)	21.0 (69.8)	25.4 (77.7)	26.9 (80.4)	25.4 (77.7)	20.4 (68.7)	13.4 (56.1)	4.9 (40.8)	−1.5 (29.3)	13.0 (55.3)
Mean daily minimum °C (°F)	−8.6 (16.5)	−4.9 (23.2)	1.5 (34.7)	8.5 (47.3)	14.3 (57.7)	19.4 (66.9)	22.4 (72.3)	21.1 (70.0)	15.3 (59.5)	7.9 (46.2)	0.0 (32.0)	−6.1 (21.0)	7.6 (45.6)
Record low °C (°F)	−20.2 (−4.4)	−16.7 (1.9)	−9.0 (15.8)	−2.6 (27.3)	4.0 (39.2)	10.4 (50.7)	16.3 (61.3)	13.1 (55.6)	5.4 (41.7)	−3.2 (26.2)	−14.6 (5.7)	−22.0 (−7.6)	−22.0 (−7.6)
Average precipitation mm (inches)	2.4 (0.09)	4.8 (0.19)	8.6 (0.34)	22.5 (0.89)	31.9 (1.26)	64.9 (2.56)	168.4 (6.63)	127.5 (5.02)	49.7 (1.96)	23.2 (0.91)	12.1 (0.48)	2.2 (0.09)	518.2 (20.42)
Average precipitation days (≥ 0.1 mm)	1.7	2.3	2.9	5.0	6.3	9.4	12.5	11.1	7.1	5.2	3.1	1.9	68.5
Average snowy days	2.3	2.3	1.1	0.2	0	0	0	0	0	0	1.7	2.3	9.9
Average relative humidity (%)	55	50	47	51	56	61	75	80	75	68	64	58	62
Mean monthly sunshine hours	169.3	171.5	215.5	236.6	251.8	209.2	172.9	188.1	195.4	186.4	160.9	165.4	2,323
Percentage possible sunshine	56	56	58	59	57	47	39	45	53	55	54	57	53
Source: China Meteorological Administration
