= Wang Yusuo =

Chinese billionaire businessman (born 1964)

- Born: 1964 (age 61–62)
- Education: People's University of China; Tianjin University
- Occupation: Businessman
- Known for: Founder and chairman of ENN Group

Wang Yusuo (Chinese: 王玉锁; pinyin: Wáng Yùsuǒ; born 1964) is a Chinese billionaire businessman. He is the founder and chairman of ENN Group, a natural gas distribution company.

== Early life ==
Wang has a bachelor's degree from the People's University of China, and a doctorate from Tianjin University.

== Career ==
Wang is the chairman of ENN Group. As of November 2015, Forbes estimated his net worth at US$3.2 billion.

== Personal life ==
He is married and lives in Langfang, China.
