= Dah Chong Hong =

Hong Kong company

Dah Chong Hong Holdings Limited 大昌行集團有限公司
- Type: Listed company
- Industry: Conglomerate
- Founded: 1949; 77 years ago
- Headquarters: Kowloon, Hong Kong
- Area served: People's Republic of China
- Key people: Chairman: Mr. Hui Ying Bun; CEO: Mr. Yip Moon Tong
- Parent: CITIC Limited
- Website: Dah Chong Hong Holdings Limited

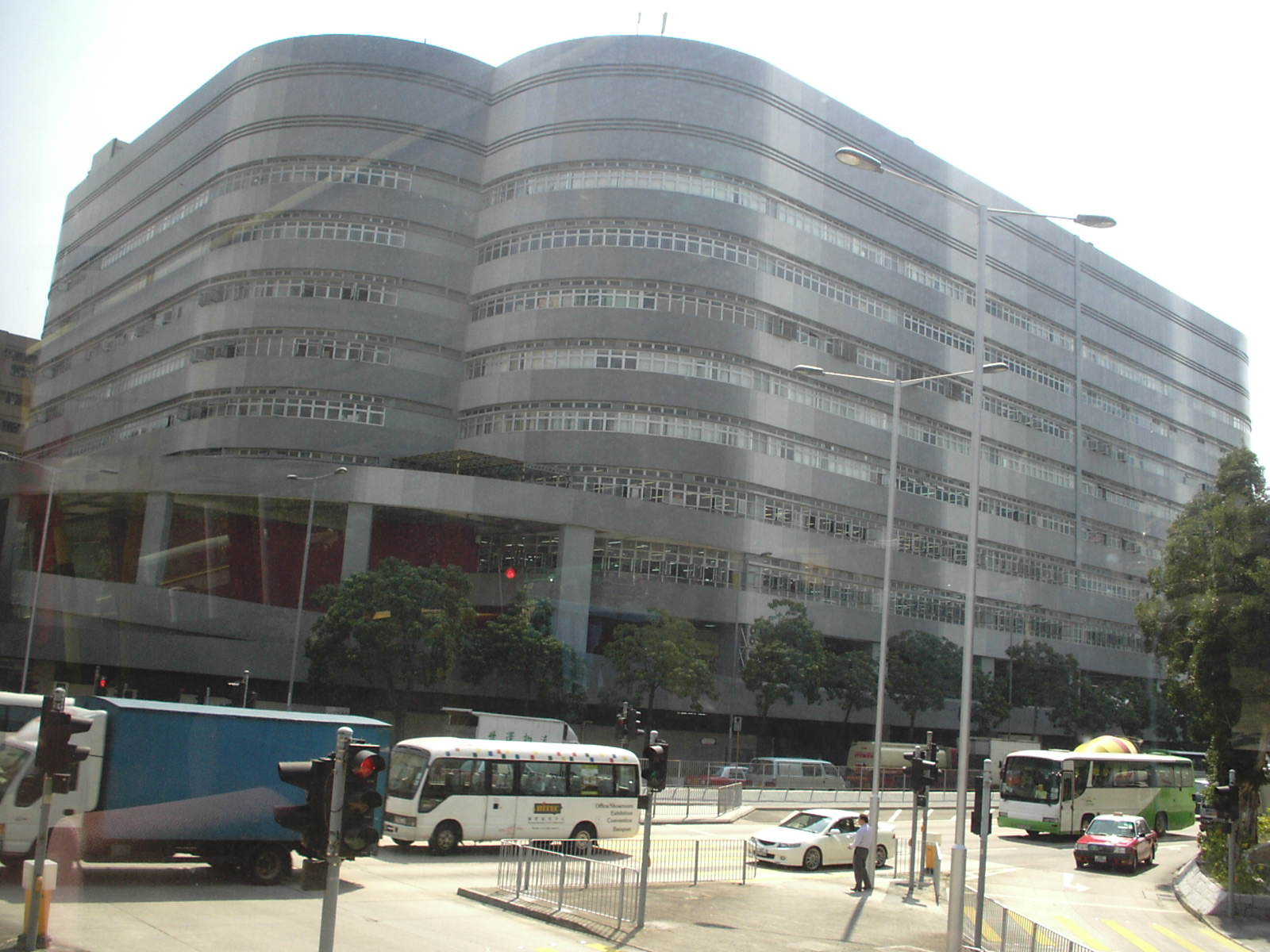
Dah Chong Hong Building in Kowloon Bay, Kowloon

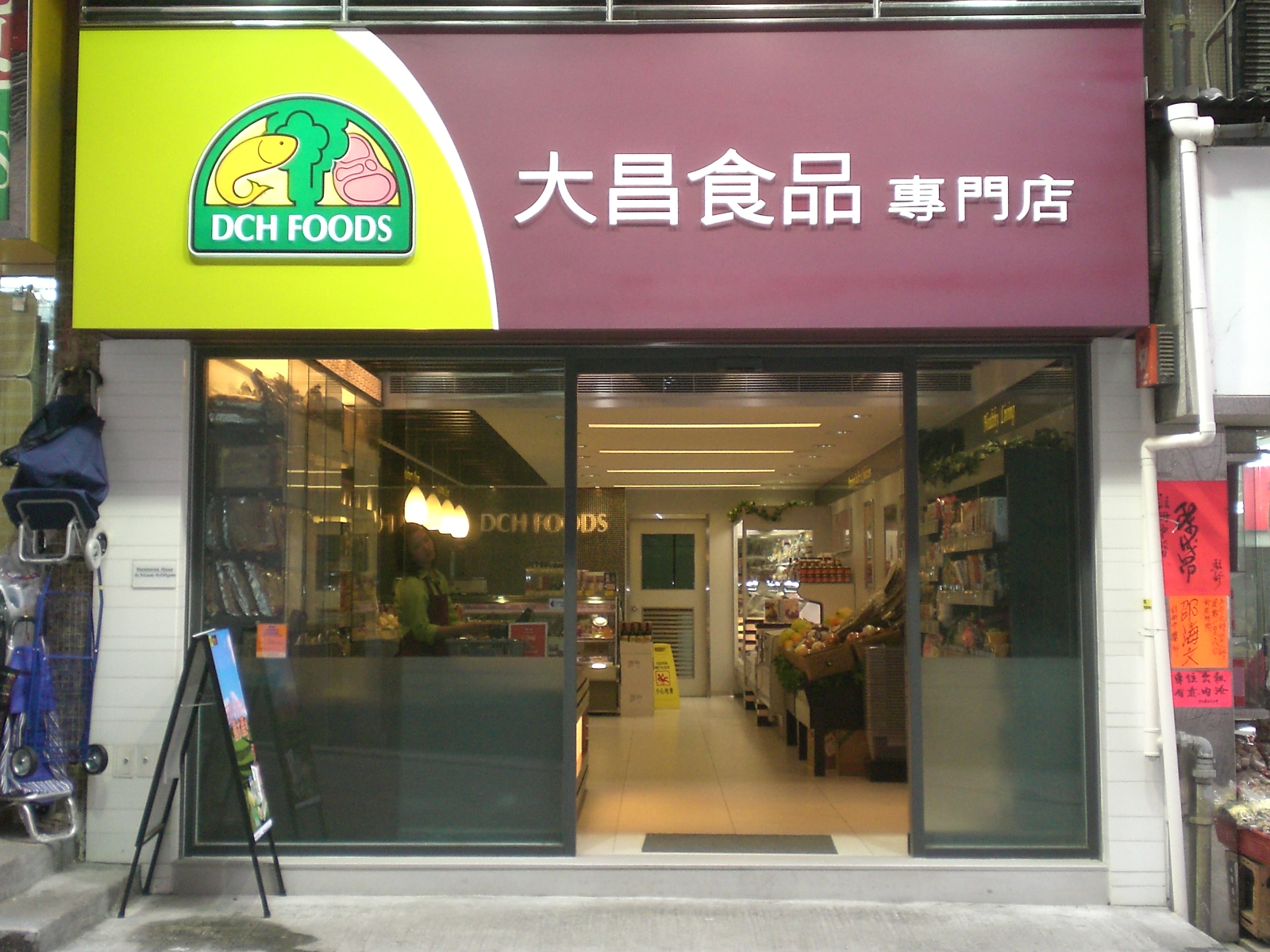
A DCH Food Mart Store in Happy Valley, Hong Kong

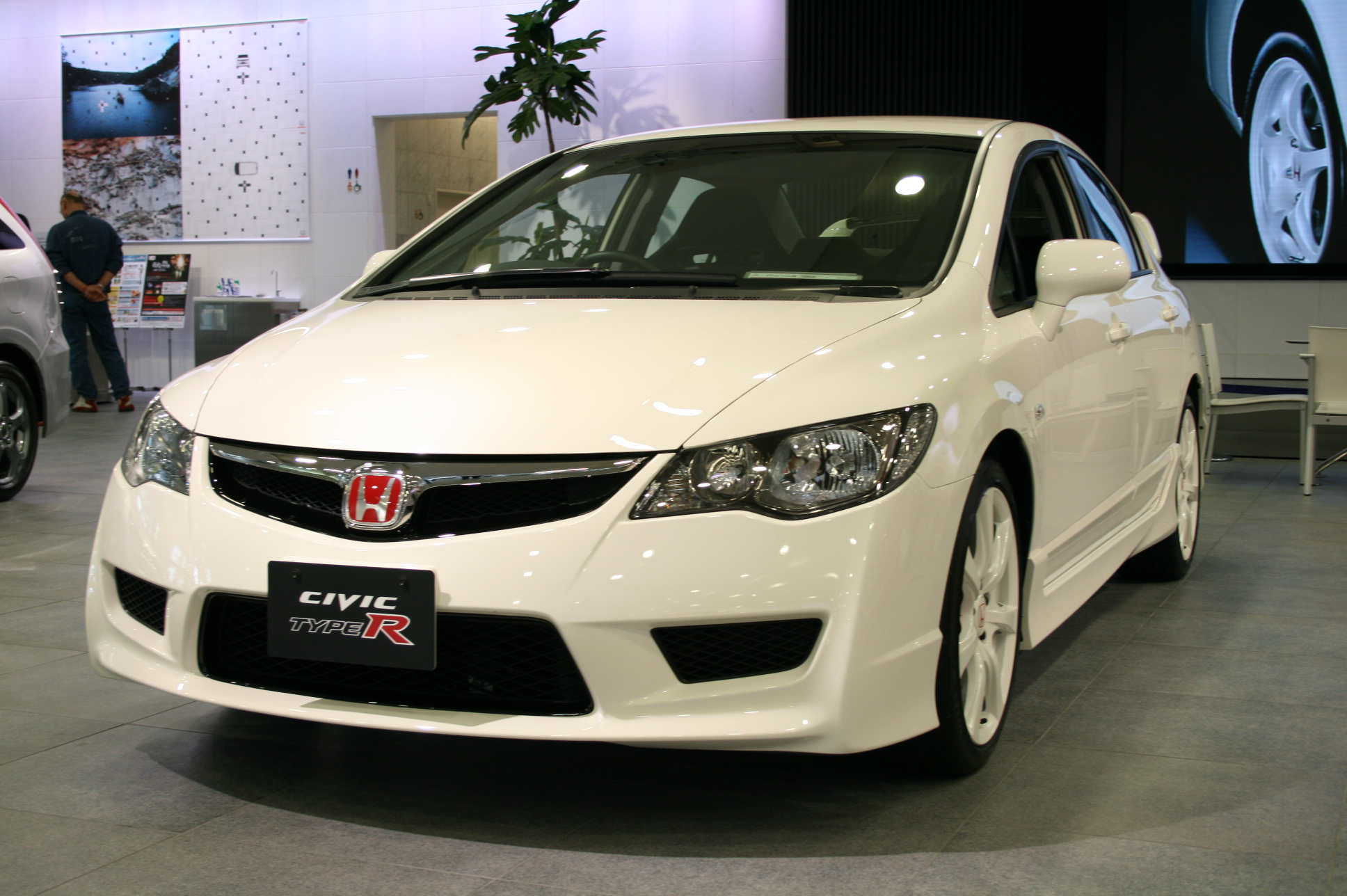
Dah Chong Hong is an agent of Honda Civic Car in Hong Kong and Macau

Dah Chong Hong Holdings Limited (DCH) (Chinese: 大昌行集團有限公司) (SEHK: 1828) is a Hong Kong–based conglomerate engaged in motor vehicle sales and repair, air cargo equipment distribution, cosmetics, airport ground support equipment maintenance, food, logistics, and warehouse services.

== History ==
- 1949: DCH was established, formerly Hang Chong Investment Company Limited (Chinese: 恒昌企業有限公司) and Dah Chong Hong Limited (Chinese: 大昌貿易行有限公司).
- 1970: Started U.S. Automotive Business in the late 1970s and continued to focus on becoming a Great Prosperous Company (Dah Chong Hong).
- 1991: CITIC Pacific first acquired an approximately 34.86% interest in the company which was an unlisted public company.
- 1992: CITIC Pacific further acquired the remaining interest in the company making it a wholly owned subsidiary of CITIC Pacific and changed its status from a public company to a private company.
- 1994: The company was renamed "Dah Chong Hong Holdings Limited".
- 2007: The company was listed on the Hong Kong Stock Exchange.

== DCH Food Mart ==
Its operating company, DCH Food Market was one of the leading food retailers in Hong Kong established in 1985, iIt was renamed DCH Food Mart in 1992. It provided various frozen seafood, meat, poultry, dried seafood and basic groceries sourced globally. As of July 2018, it operated over 47 branches premium specialty store DCH Food Mart Deluxe, DCH Food Mart Deluxe stores in Hong Kong and also two branches of DCH Food Mart.

On 15 March 2024, DCH Food announced the closure of all stores due to external factors and operational challenges.
