= Sunny Optical =

Chinese optical lens manufacturer

Sunny Optical Technology (Group) Co. Ltd.
- Type: Public
- Traded as: SEHK: 2382; Hang Seng Index Component
- ISIN: KYG8586D1097
- Industry: Optics manufacturing
- Predecessor: Yuyao City Second Optical Instruments Factory; Yuyao City Zhonglida Optoelectronic Company
- Founded: 21 September 2006; 20 years ago in Grand Cayman
- Founder: Wang Wenjian
Headquarters
Ningbo, China	(de facto)
Grand Cayman, the Cayman Islands	(registered office)
- Area served: Exported worldwide
- Key people: Ye Liaoning (Chairman)
- Revenue: ▲US$5.477 billion (2019)
- Net income: ▲US$578 million (2019)
- Total assets: ▲US$4.406 billion (2019)
- Total equity: ▲US$1.802 billion (2019)
- Number of employees: ▼16,535 FT employees (2018)

Chinese name
- Simplified Chinese: 舜宇光学科技（集团）有限公司
- Traditional Chinese: 舜宇光學科技（集團）有限公司
Transcriptions
Standard Mandarin
- Hanyu Pinyin: shùnyǔ guāngxué kējì (jítuán) yǒuxiàn gōngsī

Sunny Optical
- Simplified Chinese: 舜宇光学
- Traditional Chinese: 舜宇光學
Transcriptions
Standard Mandarin
- Hanyu Pinyin: shùnyǔ guāngxué
Yue: Cantonese
- Jyutping: seon3 jyu5 gwong1 hok6

Sunny
- Chinese: 舜宇
Transcriptions
Standard Mandarin
- Hanyu Pinyin: shùnyǔ
Yue: Cantonese
- Jyutping: seon3 jyu5
- Rating: Baa2 (Moody's, October 2019)
- Website: www.sunnyoptical.com/en/
- Footnotes; In consolidated financial statement; equity and profit excluding minority interests; in Hong Kong Financial Reporting Standards

Sunny Optical Technology (Group) Company Limited, known as Sunny Optical or just Sunny is a Chinese civilian-run enterprise and listed company that produces optical lenses.

Headquartered in Yuyao, Ningbo, Zhejiang Province, Sunny Optical Technology designs, manufactures, and sells optical devices, including lens modules, camera modules, photoelectric vision products, microscopic, analytical and surveying instruments. It is a leading supplier to major smartphone brands including Apple, Samsung, Huawei, Xiaomi, Oppo and Vivo.

== History ==
=== Predecessors ===
According to the company itself, the predecessor of Sunny Optical was founded in October 1984 as Yuyao County Second Optical Instruments Factory (Chinese: 余姚县第二光学仪器厂) in Yuyao County, Zhejiang Province. Since 1985 Yuyao became a county-level city, thus the factory was renamed to Yuyao City Second Optical Instrument Factory . The factory started its partnership with the Zhejiang University in 1988, and renamed as Yuyao City Second Optical Instrument Factory Zhejiang University Optical Instrument Faculty Yuayo Optoelectronic Instrument Factory (Chinese: 余姚市第二光学仪器厂浙江大学光仪系余姚光电仪器厂) in 1989. It was also known as Yuyao Optoelectronic (Chinese: 余姚光电). At that time, the university designed the optics and the factory manufactured them.

In 1993, Yuyao Optoelectronic and other co-founders, incorporated Yuyao City Zhonglida Optoelectronic Company (Chinese: 余姚市众利达光电公司). At that time, Zhonglida was a village collective enterprise. Out of 118 natural person shareholders, only Wang Wenjian (Chinese: 王文鉴) and Lu Benxu (Chinese: 鲁本绪; pinyin: Lǔ Běnxù) owned more than 3% stakes at that time. While Yuyao Optoelectronic, owned one-fifth of the share capital of Zhonglida. In 1994 Yuyao Optoelectronic was converted into a joint-stock limited company. The employees of the factory, presented by the staff shareholding committee, owned 52.28% shares of Yuyao Optoelectronic at that time. A subsidiary of the Zhejiang University: Zhejiang University Optoelectronic Technology Development Company (Chinese: 浙大光电技术开发公司), was the second largest shareholder, for 19.44% stake.

After 1996 capital increase, Yuyao Optoelectronic owned 51.06% shares of Zhonglida.

Zhonglida was renamed to Zhejiang Sunny Limited (Chinese: 浙江舜宇有限公司; pinyin: Zhèjiāng shùnyǔ yǒuxiàn gōngsī) in April 2000. Yuyao Optoelectronic ceased to be the parent company of Zhejiang Sunny in April 2000, sold 51.06% shares of Zhejiang Sunny to the aforementioned Staff Shareholding Committee. Zhejiang Sunny was renamed to Sunny Group Limited (Chinese: 舜宇集团有限公司) in May 2000.

According to media, Wang Wenjian was the founder of the factory in 1984. As of 2018, Wang Wenjian was a Non-Executive Director and the Honorary Chairman of the listed company. Wang Wenjian has no relation to Wang Wenjie (Chinese: 王文杰), an executive director and Standing Vice-president of the company.

=== Sunny Optical Technology (Group) ===
The current holding company of the group, Sunny Optical Technology (Group) Company Limited, was incorporated in the Cayman Islands on 21 September 2006, as an exempted company.

Sunny Optical became a listed company in 2007. It became a component of the blue-chip index the Hang Seng Index in 2017.

As of 2019, Citigroup analysts stated that Sunny Optical was not interested in joining Apple's supply chain, "given its focus on China brands and Samsung so far[.]". It was rumoured that Sunny passed the qualification to be Apple's supplier for 2020. Sunny was listed on Apple's supplier list for 2022.
