= Shenzhou International =

Global apparel manufacturer

- Company type: Private
- Traded as: SEHK: 2313; Component of Hang Seng Index
- Industry: Apparel
- Founder: Ma Jianrong
- Headquarters: Hong Kong
- Area served: Worldwide
- Website: www.shenzhounintl.com

Shenzhou International Group Holdings Limited is a Chinese clothing manufacturer. With over 97,000 employees, it produces more than 250,000 metric tons of fabric and 550 million garments annually.

The company works closely with NIKE, UNIQLO, adidas, PUMA, lululemon, and many others. In response to global apparel demand, it established production bases in Phnom Penh, Cambodia; Ningbo and Anqing, China; and Ho Chi Minh City and Tây Ninh, Vietnam.

The chairman is Ma Jianrong, who started as a factory worker and rose to become a multi-billionaire.
