= Xinyi Xu =

Chinese-American statistician

Xinyi Xu is a Chinese-American statistician and a professor of statistics at Ohio State University. Her research includes work on high-dimensional Bayesian hierarchical modeling, model selection, and density estimation.

== Education and career ==
Xu has a 2001 bachelor's degree in mathematics from the University of Science and Technology of China. She went to the University of Pennsylvania for graduate study in statistics, earning a master's degree in 2003 and completing her Ph.D. in 2005. Her dissertation, Estimation of High Dimensional Predictive Densities, was supervised by Edward I. George.

She took her present position at Ohio State University in 2005, and earned tenure there in 2012.

== Recognition ==
Xu received the 2005 Savage Award of the International Society for Bayesian Analysis, for one of two best dissertations that year.

She was named as a Fellow of the American Statistical Association in 2022, "for her fundamental contributions to predictive estimation and decision theory, Bayesian nonparametric methods, and model choice; for her service to the statistics profession; and for her advancement of Bayesian methods throughout the world".
