= Alibaba Health =

Healthcare unit of the Alibaba Group

Alibaba Health Information Technology Limited
- Native name: 阿里健康信息技术有限公司
- Company type: Public subsidiary
- Traded as: SEHK: 241; Hang Seng Index component
- Industry: Digital health
- Founded: 2014; 12 years ago
- Headquarters: Beijing, China
- Key people: Zhu Shunyan (Chairman); Shen Difan (CEO)
- Revenue: ▲CN¥26.76 billion (2023)
- Net income: ▲CN¥5.34 million (2023)
- Total assets: ▲CN¥20.75 billion (2023)
- Total equity: ▲CN¥15.13 billion (2023)
- Number of employees: 1,560 (2023)
- Parent: Alibaba Group
- Website: www.alihealth.cn

Alibaba Health (AliHealth; Chinese: 阿里健康; pinyin: Ālǐ Jiànkāng) is a Chinese company listed in Hong Kong that focuses on providing digital health services and resources. It is currently the healthcare unit of the Alibaba Group (Alibaba).

== History ==
The origins of the company can be traced back to Shui Hing, a Hong Kong retail company that was listed on the Hong Kong Stock Exchange in 1971.

In 1998, Shui Hing was sold to fashion retailer Easyknit International Holdings and was rebranded to Easy Concepts.

In 2000, CITIC Group acquired Easy Concepts and later renamed it to CITIC 21CN.

In January 2014, Alibaba and Yunfeng Capital acquired a controlling stake in CITIC 21CN for US$170 million. It was speculated that the then-private Alibaba was using the acquisition for a reverse takeover so it could be listed in Hong Kong but according to people familiar with Alibaba, there was no intention to do so. Alibaba stated the reason for the acquisition was because CITIC 21CN's drug data platform could help it expand into the healthcare industry. CITIC 21CN was subsequently renamed to Alibaba Health.

In 2015, Alibaba agreed to transfer the operations of its online pharmacy business from Tmall to AliHealth for US$2.5 billion of newly issued shares and convertible bonds. However AliHealth let the deal lapse due to regulatory uncertainties for online drug sales. In May 2018, Alibaba announced it will sell several of the healthcare categories on Tmall to AliHealth for US$1.35 billion.

In 2018, AliHealth made multiple investments in offline healthcare companies which included Guizhou Ensure, ShuYu Civilian Pharmacy Corporation and Huaren Health. AliHealth which had been making losses for multiple years, wanted to find ways to generate stable cash flows to improve profitability.

During the COVID-19 pandemic, AliHealth shares reached its highest point as it reported increased revenue due to direct sales. AliHealth which had been reporting net losses each year since inception had reported its first profitable year.

In November 2023, AliHealth stated it would acquire AJK Technology Holding Ltd from Taobao for US$1.73 billion. The deal would give it certain services of Alibaba's marketing tool to improve profitability.

== See also ==
- Alibaba Group
