= Foundation for God's Glory =

Foundation for God's Glory (FGG) is a non-profit corporation registered in the State of New York. It is exempted from Federal income tax under section 501(c)(3) of the Internal Revenue Code. The Internal Revenue Service classified it as a private operating foundation described in section 4942(j)(3) of the Code. Its founder and executive director is Dante Raul "DR" Teodoro.

== Mission ==
FGG's mission is to improve the quality of life of the underprivileged by empowering them through scholarship grants, hunger alleviation and disaster relief projects.

== History ==
FGG was founded in 2004 in response to the success of Juno Healthcare Staffing Systems, Inc., a recruitment staffing that Dante Raul "DR" Teodoro, his wife Nonita "NT" Teodoro and their daughter Charm Teodoro started in 2001. Through FGG, the Teodoro family developed an effective means of organizing their acts of charity to give back to the community.

Because of the foundation's contributions to society, DR Teodoro received two awards, namely, the Twenty Outstanding Filipinos Abroad Award for 2008 and the Humanitarian Leadership Award for 2007. NT Teodoro was also honored with the New York Women of Excellence Award.
