= Ma Jianrong =

Chinese billionaire businessman

- Chinese: 馬建榮
- Born: 1965 (age 59–60); Shaoxing, Zhejiang province, China
- Occupation: Businessman
- Title: Chairman, Shenzhou International
- Predecessor: Ma Baoxing

Ma Jianrong (Chinese: 馬建榮; born 1965) is a Chinese billionaire businessman in the textile industry, and the chairman of Shenzhou International Group Holdings Limited, a knitwear and garments manufacturer based in China. As of August 2023, his net worth was estimated at US$7.3 billion.

== Early life ==
In 1965, Ma was born in Shaoxing, Zhejiang province, China. His father is Baoxing Ma. At age 13, Ma started as an apprentice in the textile industry in China.

== Career ==
Ma worked for Shaoxing Cotton Mill and Hangzhou Linping Knitting and Garment Plant in China.

Ma Jianrong started as a factory worker, and rose to become chairman of the clothing manufacturer Shenzhou International, one of China's largest garment exporters with customers including Nike, Adidas ad Uniqlo.

In 1989, Ma joined the Shenzhou International Group and served as the manager of the knitting and weaving department. In April 2005, Ma became the acting chairman of Ningbo Shenzhou Knitting Co., Ltd.

As of November 2017, Forbes estimated his net worth at US$5.7 billion.

As of 2016, Ma is the chairman of Shenzhou International Group Holdings Limited. Ma is ranked #39 in Forbes China Rich List (2016).

== Personal life ==
Ma is married, and resides in Ningbo, Zhejiang province, China.
