= Nobuyoshi =

- Gender: Male

Origin
- Origin: Japanese
- Meaning: Different meanings depending on the kanji used

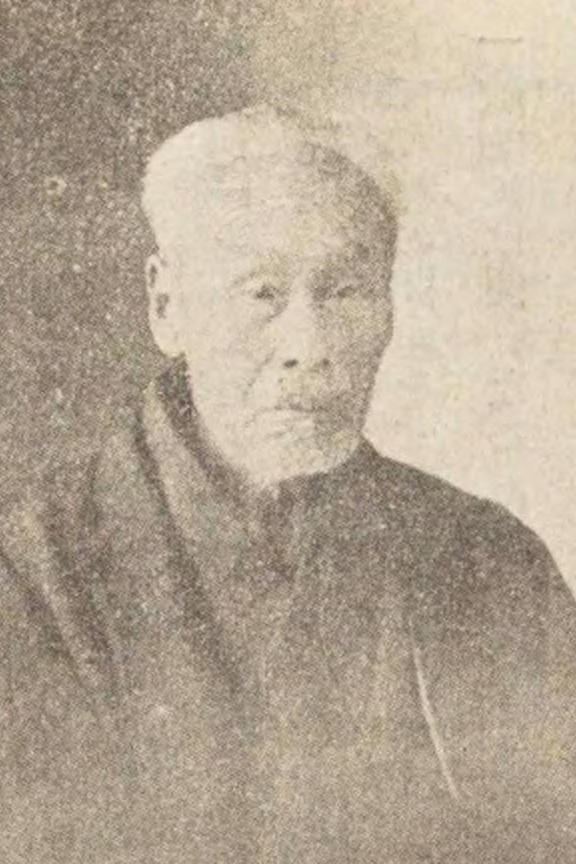
Hagiwara Nobuyoshi

Nobuyoshi (written: 信吉, 信芳, 信義, 信喜, 信由, 経惟) is a masculine Japanese given name. Notable people with the name include:

- Nobuyoshi Araki (荒木 経惟; born 1940), Japanese photographer and artist
- Nobuyoshi Fujisawa (藤澤 信義; born 1970), Japanese chief executive
- Hokutoumi Nobuyoshi (北勝海 信芳; born 1963), Japanese sumo wrestler
- Nobuyoshi Kuwano (桑野 信義; born 1957), Japanese comedian
- Nobuyoshi Miura (三浦 信由; born 1944), Japanese middle distance runner
- Nobuyoshi Mutō (武藤 信義; 1868–1933), Japanese general and diplomat
- Nobuyoshi Sadanaga (貞永 信義; 1929–2003), Japanese long-distance runner
- Nobuyoshi Sano (佐野 信義; born 1969), Japanese composer and musician
- Takeda Nobuyoshi (武田 信吉; 1583–1603), Japanese daimyō
- Nobuyoshi Tamura (田村 信喜; 1933–2010), Japanese aikidoka
- Tsugaru Nobuyoshi (津軽 信義; 1619–1655), Japanese daimyō
