= Yunnan Astronomical Observatory =

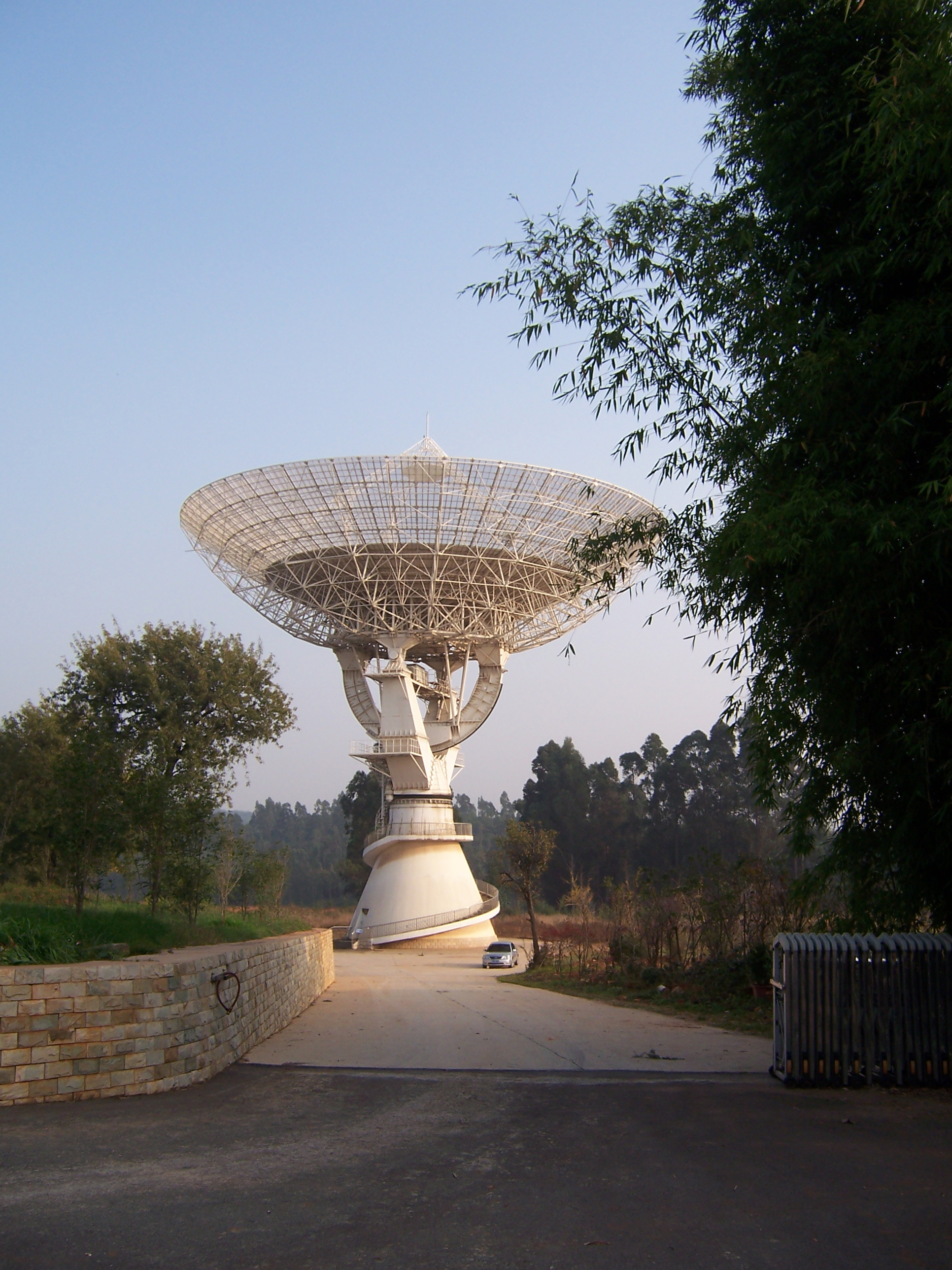
- Alternative names: Yunnan Observatory
- Organization: Chinese Academy of Sciences
- Observatory code: 286
- Location: Kunming, Yunnan
- Coordinates: 25°02′N 102°47′E
- Altitude: 2,014 m (6,608 ft)
- Established: 1938
- Website: www.ynao.ac.cn
- Telescopes: Lijiang 2.4m Telescope; New Vacuum Solar Telescope; Yunnan 1m Telescope; Yunnan 40m Radio Telescope
- Location of Yunnan Astronomical Observatory
- Related media on Commons

Yunnan Astronomical Observatory (YAO; Chinese: 云南天文台) an institution of Chinese Academy of Sciences sits on the Phoenix Hill in the east suburbs of Kunming, Yunnan, China. It is the only research observatory in the southwest of China. It is a state institution for astronomy research and public science education. There are 8 research groups and 2 observing stations in YAO.

It was founded during the Japanese invasion of China by astronomers from the Beijing Astronomical Observatory and the Purple Mountain Observatory evacuated from their home towns.

Groups:

- Solar physics
- Stellar physics
- Stellar population
- Extragalactic physics
- AGN jets
- Binary Population Synthesis
- High-energy astrophysics
- Astrodynamics & astrometry
- Southern Observing Station

Facilities:

- Lijiang 2.4 m telescope
- Fuxian Lake 1 m solar tower
- ynao 1 m telescope
- 40 m radio telescope

== See also ==
- National Astronomical Observatory of China
- List of observatory codes
- List of astronomical observatories around the world
