= ENN Group =

ENN Group 新奥集团
- Company type: Private
- Industry: natural gas
- Founded: 1993; 33 years ago
- Founder: Wang Yusuo
- Headquarters: Langfang, China
- Key people: Wang Yusuo, chairman Yu Yang, vice chairman and CEO
- Website: www.enn.cn

ENN Group
- Simplified Chinese: 新奥集团
- Traditional Chinese: 新奧集團
Transcriptions
Standard Mandarin
- Hanyu Pinyin: Xīnào Jítuán

ENN Group (Chinese: 新奥集团; pinyin: Xīnào Jítuán) is a Chinese energy company and one of China's largest privately held companies.

Founded by Wang Yusuo in 1993, ENN started in natural gas, and has expanded into solar energy, energy chemicals and real estate.

== Subsidiaries ==
- ENN Energy Holdings
- ENN Natural Gas
- ENN Ecological Holdings
- ENC Digital Technology
- Tibet Tourism Co.

== Chinese gas system ==
In China, ENN operates a 17000km natural gas pipeline for supplying natural gas powered transport vehicles. In 2013, the network had 238 gas stations in 59 cities.

ENN partnered with the Canadian company Westport Innovations to build liquefaction and liquid natural gas (LNG) stations in North America. Cheniere Energy and ENN Group reached a deal in 2021 which ENN would buy LNG from Cheniere. However, this deal was interrupted by the China–United States trade war before the parties came to a new 20 year deal in 2023.

In 2024, BASF agreed to use ENN as their natural gas supplier for the next 15 years at their chemical processing facility in Zhanjiang.

== Blu LNG ==
Blu LNG (also known as Transfuels LLC) is a joint venture (JV) between ENN and CH4 Energy Corp. The JV is led by Merritt Norton and Jun Yang who represent CH4 and ENN respectively. The company builds LNG stations for truck refueling. In 2013, when Blu began constructing LNG stations in Utah, the United States had 28 LNG stations. Blu planned to build about 50 stations in 2013 and an additional 500 over an unspecified time period but as of 2023 the United States only had 50 total stations.

== Nuclear fusion ==
Since 2017, ENN Research has been researching and developing a nuclear fusion power reactor based on magnetic confinement fusion, specifically a form of tokamak of low aspect ratio named a spheromak, which the firm terms a "spherical torus". They are working toward reacting proton–boron fuel to achieve aneutronic fusion.

== See also ==
- List of largest oil and gas companies by revenue
- List of nuclear fusion companies
