= Sino Biopharmaceutical Limited =

Chinese pharmaceutical company

Sino Biopharmaceutical
- Type: Public
- Traded as: SEHK: 1177; Hang Seng Index component
- Industry: Pharmaceutical
- Founded: 2000
- Headquarters: Hong Kong
- Area served: China
- Key people: Ms. Tse, Theresa Y Y (Chairwoman of the Board) Mr. Tse, Eric S Y (CEO)
- Products: Innovative medicines, biopharmaceuticals, chemical medicines
- Number of employees: 25,000 (2024)
- Website: Sino Biopharmaceutical Limited

Sino Biopharmaceutical Limited (SEHK: 1177|Hang Seng Index component) (simplified Chinese: 中国生物制药有限公司; traditional Chinese: 中國生物製藥有限公司), shortly SBP Group, is a pharmaceutical conglomerate in China. The Company was listed on the Hong Kong Stock Exchange in 2000 and included in 2013 as a constituent stock of MSCI Global Standard Indices – MSCI China Index, Hang Seng Index in 2018, Hang Seng China Enterprises Index in 2019, and Hang Seng Connect Biotech 50 Index and Hang Seng China (Hong Kong-listed) 25 Index in 2020.

The Group’s principal subsidiaries include: Chia Tai Tianqing Pharmaceutical Group Co. Ltd. (“CT Tianqing”), Beijing Tide Pharmaceutical Co. Ltd. (“Beijing Tide”), Nanjing Chia Tai Tianqing Pharmaceutical Co., Ltd. (“NJCTT”), Jiangsu Chia Tai Fenghai Pharmaceutical Co., Ltd. (“Jiangsu CT Fenghai”), Jiangsu Chia Tai Qingjiang Pharmaceutical Co., Ltd. (“Jiangsu CT Qingjiang”) and invoX Pharma Limited (“invoX”). Its products including biopharmaceutical and chemical medicines are used in a host of therapeutic areas, such as tumors, liver diseases, respiratory system diseases and surgery/analgesia.
