= Hang Seng School of Commerce =

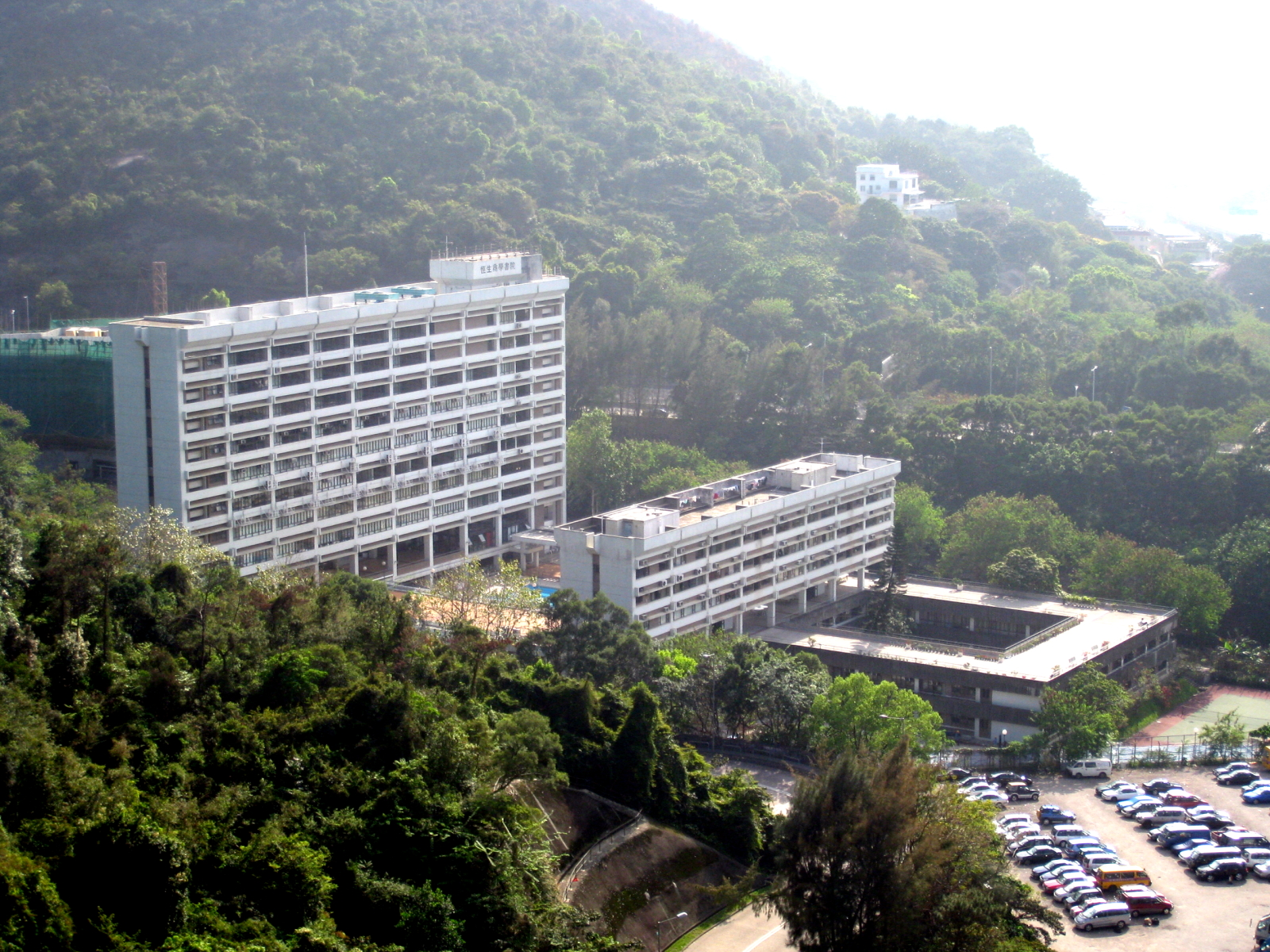
- Hang Seng School of Commerce/ Hang Seng Management College

Location
- Hong Kong
- 22°22′44.9″N 114°12′41.4″E

Information
- Motto: 博學篤行 (Erudition and Perseverance)
- Opened: 1980
- Website: http://www.hssc.edu.hk

Hang Seng School of Commerce
- Traditional Chinese: 恒生商學書院
- Simplified Chinese: 恒生商学书院
Transcriptions
Standard Mandarin
- Hanyu Pinyin: Héng Shēng Shāngxué Shūyuàn
Yue: Cantonese
- Yale Romanization: Hàhng sāng sēung hohk syū yún
- Jyutping: Hang4 sang1 soeng1 hok6 syu1 jyun6*2

Hang Seng School of Commerce (HSSC) was a Hong Kong business school. The school was officially opened on 12 February 1981. In 2010, the school was promoted to a private university-level institution (The Hang Seng Management College). In 2018, Hang Seng Management College was granted university status and was renamed as The Hang Seng University of Hong Kong.

== History ==
Hang Seng School of Commerce was founded in 1980 with funding from Hang Seng Bank, the S.H.Ho Foundation and several Hang Seng Bank directors. From 1980 to 2009, Hang Seng School of Commerce was a provider of post-secondary programmes in business and related areas.

== Programmes ==
The school offered programmes in business and related subjects:

- Diploma courses
- Two-year full-time Hong Kong A-level course
- One-year pre-associate degree
- Two-year associate degree
- One-year top-up degree programmes

== See also ==
- University of Hong Kong
- Chinese University of Hong Kong
- Hong Kong University of Science and Technology
- Hang Seng Management College
- Hang Seng University of Hong Kong
- Education in Hong Kong
