= CSPC Pharmaceutical Group =

Chinese pharmaceutical company

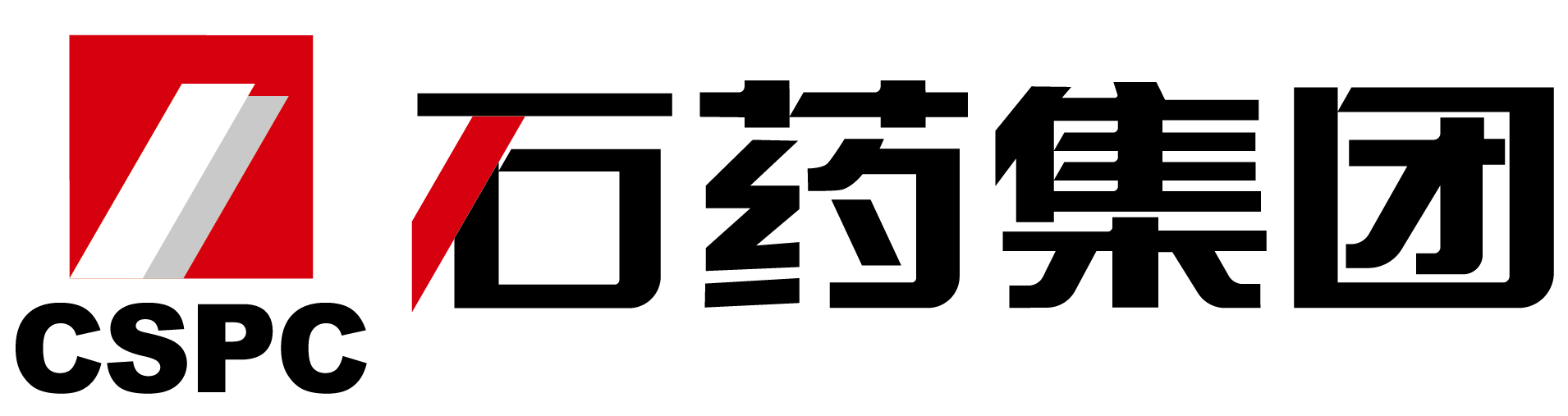
- Type: listed
- Traded as: SEHK: 1093 (Blue chip)
- Industry: Medication
- Headquarters: Wan Chai, Hong Kong
- Key people: Cai Dongchen (Chairman); Zhang Cuilong (CEO)
- Revenue: ▲¥CNY 27.867 billion (2021/12)
- Operating income: ▲¥ CNY 6.847 billion (2021/12)
- Net income: ▲¥CNY 5.605 billion (2021/12)
- Total assets: ▲¥CNY 34.742 billion (2021/12)
- Total equity: ▲¥CNY 26.828 billion (2021/12)
- Website: www.e-cspc.com

CSPC Pharmaceutical Group (simplified Chinese: 石药集团有限公司; traditional Chinese: 石藥集團有限公司; pinyin: Shíyào jítuán yǒuxiàn gōngsī) (China Pharma, SEHK: 1093, Hang Seng Index component) researches, develops, manufactures and sells pharmaceutical products. Its headquarters is in China's Hebei Province.

CSPC produces both active pharmaceutical ingredient (API) and formulations. API products include penicillin, cefalosporins, synthetic vitamins, caffeine and ranitidine. Formulations include antibiotics, butylphthalide (NBP) and analgesics, in addition to nearly 1,000 other products.

CSPC's 15,000 employees are divided among more than ten subsidiaries, including CSPC Zhongrun, Weisheng, Zhongnuo and NBP.

CSPC Pharma's total assets are valued above RMB 8 billion. In 2007, CSPC Pharma achieved sales of RMB 8 billion and net income of RMB 485 million. Direct exports of US$300 million ranked CSPC first among China's pharmaceutical enterprises.

One subsidiary, China Pharmaceutical Group Co., Ltd (China Pharma) is based in Hong Kong. It is listed on the Hang Seng China-Affiliated Corporations Index. In 2003 and 2004, China Pharma was listed as one of 100 excellent listed companies with turnover less than $1 billion.

CSPC Pharma is recognized as one of China's "500 Most Valuable Chinese Brands" and "Top 500 Chinese Enterprises." In 2007, CSPC Pharma ranked second among China's top 100 pharmaceutical industry companies.

== See also ==
- Pharmaceutical industry in China
