= Xinyi Glass =

Chinese glass manufacturer

Xinyi Glass Holdings Limited 信義玻璃控股有限公司
- Type: Public company
- Traded as: SEHK: 868; Hang Seng Index component
- Industry: Glass manufacturing and sales
- Founded: 1988
- Headquarters: Hong Kong
- Area served: China
- Key people: Chairman: Lee Yin Yee (李賢義) Vice Chairman: Tung Ching Bor CEO: Tan Sri Datuk TUNG Ching Sai
- Number of employees: 14,059
- Website: www.xinyiglass.com

Xinyi Glass Holdings Limited is a public company in People's Republic of China, engaged in the production of float glass, automobile glass and construction glass. Its customers includes large international automobile corporations such as Ford, General Motors and Volkswagen of Germany. It was established in 1988 and headquartered in Hong Kong. It was listed on the Hong Kong Stock Exchange in 2005. In 2020, a proposed plant by Xinyi in Stratford, Ontario attracted protests on environmental and national security grounds, and was later abandoned. It has been a constituent of the Hang Seng Index (HSI) since 6 September 2021.

== See also ==
- Xinyi Solar Holdings Limited
