= Hang Seng University of Hong Kong =

Private university in New Territories, Hong Kong

The Hang Seng University of Hong Kong
- 香港恒生大學 (Chinese)
- Former names: Hang Seng School of Commerce; Hang Seng Management College
- Motto: 博學篤行
- Motto in English: Erudition and Perseverance
- Type: Self-financing
- Established: 4 May 2010; 16 years ago (as Hang Seng Management College); 30 October 2018; 7 years ago (granted university status)
- Affiliations: Alliance of Asian Liberal Arts Universities
- Chairman: Ms Luanne Lim (2025 - present); Ms Diana Cesar (2021 to 2025); Ms Louisa Cheang (2018 to 2021); Ms Rose Lee Wai-mun (2013 to 2018)
- President: Professor Joshua Mok Ka-ho
- Vice-president: Professor David Tse; Acting Provost and Vice-President (Academic and Research); Professor Jeanne Fu Ho Ying; Vice-President (Learning and Student Experience); Dr Josiah Chan Tin-yan; Vice-President (Organisational Development); Ms Antonia Yeung Yu-hung Associate Vice-President (Development and Campus Services)
- Academic staff: 222
- Students: 7,536 (Enrolment 2025/26)
- Location: Hang Shin Link, Siu Lek Yuen, Sha Tin, Hong Kong; 22°22′44.9″N 114°12′41.4″E
- Campus: Sha Tin
- Website: www.hsu.edu.hk

Chinese name
- Simplified Chinese: 香港恒生大学
- Traditional Chinese: 香港恒生大學
- Cantonese Yale: Hēunggóng Hàhngsāng Daaihhohk
Transcriptions
Standard Mandarin
- Hanyu Pinyin: Xiānggǎng Héng Shēng Dàxué
Yue: Cantonese
- Yale Romanization: Hēunggóng Hàhngsāng Daaihhohk
- Jyutping: Hoeng1gong2 Hang4sang1 Daai6hok6
- IPA: [hœŋ˥.kɔŋ˧˥ hɐŋ˩.sɐŋ˥ taj˨.hɔk̚˨]

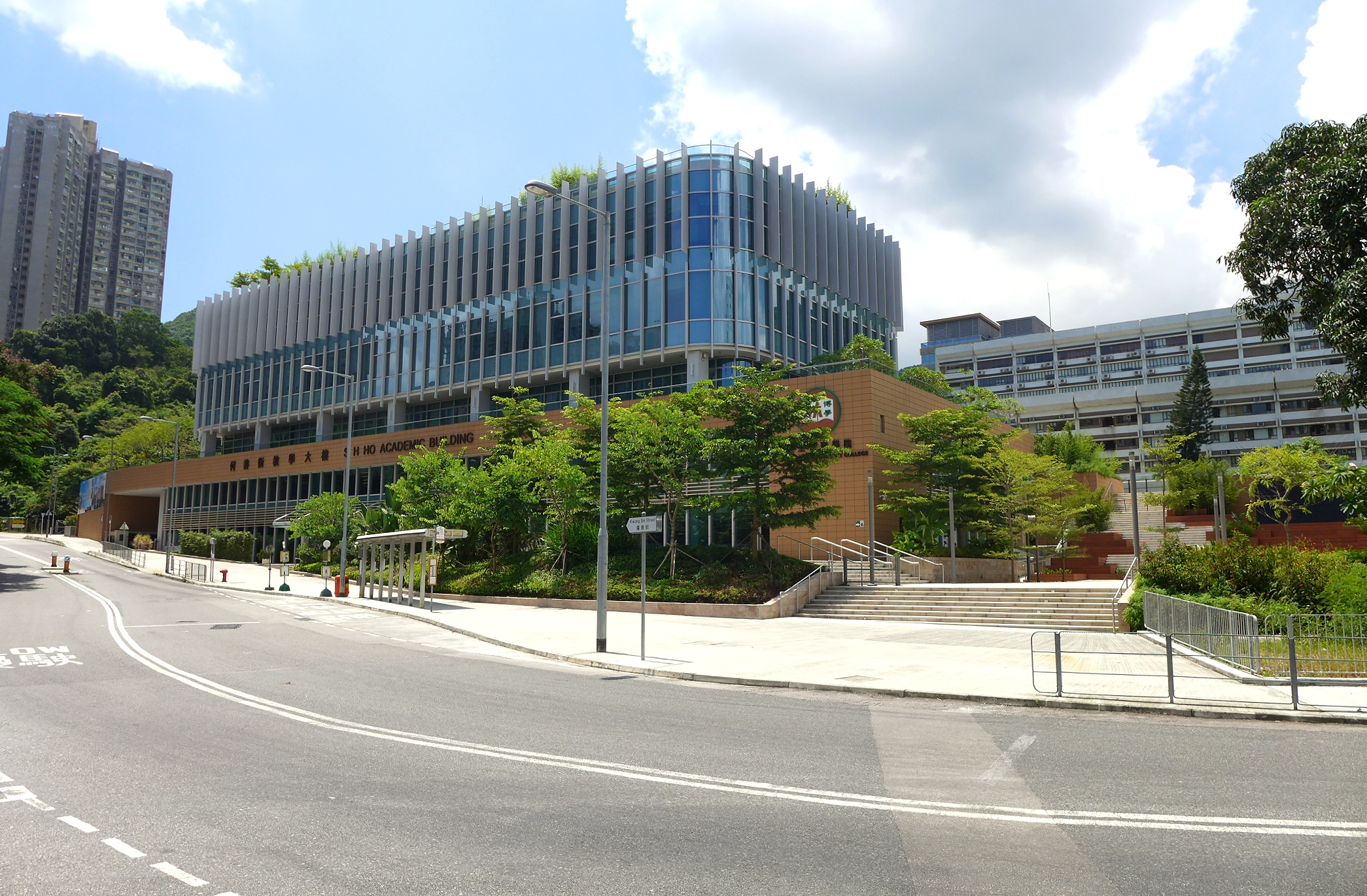
A snap of the campus in Sha Tin

The Hang Seng University of Hong Kong (HSUHK) is a private liberal arts-oriented university in Sha Tin, New Territories, Hong Kong.

The institute was founded as Hang Seng Management College in 2010 from the Hang Seng School of Commerce. The college was granted university title in 2018.

In November and December 2013, HSMC obtained accreditation from the Hong Kong Council for Accreditation of Academic and Vocational Qualifications for the following five programmes and was approved by the Education Bureau to offer degree programmes: On 30 October 2018, the Chief Executive-in-Council approved the retitling of Hang Seng Management College into a university under Section 8(1) of the Post Secondary Colleges Ordinance, following an institutional review by the HKCAAVQ.

The Chief Executive in Council approved the university status of Hang Seng Management College (HSMC) on 30 October 2018. The HSMC is the first self-financing post-secondary education institution to acquire a university title since the publication of the revised roadmap of criteria for acquiring university title for post-secondary colleges registered under the Ordinance in 2015.

== Education Model ==
The university's “Liberal + Professional” model builds on the tradition of liberal education, which offers students a wide-ranging cultural foundation. This approach is enhanced by integrating professional disciplines, enabling students to gain a broad perspective alongside specialized professional knowledge.

== Academics ==
The Hang Seng University of Hong Kong is listed the 7th (overall) in the ASEAN+ region, the 1st in the Greater China region, and the 1st in Employability as per the 2023 AppliedHE ASEAN+ private university assessment by the Singapore-based AppliedHE.

The institute ranked #514 in QS university ranking for Asian in 2026.

== Schools and Departments ==
The Hang Seng University of Hong Kong consists of six schools.

School of Business
Department of Accountancy
Department of Economics and Finance
Department of Management
Department of Marketing
School of Communication
School of Decision Sciences
Department of Computing
Department of Mathematics, Statistics and Insurance
Department of Supply Chain and Information Management
School of Humanities and Social Science
Department of Art and Design
Department of Chinese
Department of English
Department of Social Science
School of Translation and Foreign Languages
School of Transdisciplinary Studies

== Programmes ==
=== Undergraduate Programmes ===
==== School of Business ====
- Economics
- Financial Analysis and FinTech
- Finance and Banking
- Management
- Marketing
- Global Business Management
- Human Resource Management
- General Business
- Professional Accountancy
- Corporate Governance and Compliance

==== School of Decision Sciences ====
- Actuarial Studies and Insurance
- Applied Computing
- Data Science and Business Intelligence
- Business Analytics and Information Management
- Supply Chain Management

==== School of Humanities and Social Science ====
- Art and Design
- Asian Studies
- Chinese
- English
- Cultural and Creative Industries
- Philosophy, Politics and Economics
- Psychology

==== School of Communication ====
- Convergent Media and Communication Technology
- Arts and Culture Communication
- Journalism and Communication

==== School of Translation and Foreign Languages ====
- Translation with Business

=== Postgraduate Programmes ===
- Doctor of Decision Analytics
- Master of Arts in Art Business
- Master of Arts in Chinese
- Master of Arts in Cultural Heritage Management
- Master of Arts in Creative Humanities
- Master of Arts in Digital Media for Online
- Master of Arts in Entertainment Media Management and Communication
- Master of Arts in English Language Teaching and Assessment
- Master of Arts in Global English Literary and Cultural Studies
- Master of Arts in Strategic Communication
- Master of Arts in Theatre Studies
- Master of Arts in Translation (Business and Legal)
- Master of Arts in Translation (Computer-aided Translation)
- Master of Business Administration (in Chinese)
- Master of Business Management
- Master of Science in Data Science and Artificial Intelligence
- Master of Science in Digital Innovation and Technology Management
- Master of Science in Entrepreneurial Management
- Master of Science in Global Supply Chain Management
- Master of Science in Insurance
- Master of Science in Risk Analytics
- Master of Social Sciences in Public Policy and Risk Governance
- Master of Social Sciences in Social Sustainability

== See also ==
- Hang Seng School of Commerce
- List of schools in Hong Kong
- Education in Hong Kong
- Higher education in Hong Kong
