= Hang Seng Indexes Company =

Stock market indexing company

Hang Seng Indexes Company Limited
- Type: Subsidiary
- Industry: Stock market
- Founded: 1984; 42 years ago
- Headquarters: Hong Kong
- Products: Hang Seng Index
- Parent: Hang Seng Bank
- Website: hsi.com.hk

Hang Seng Indexes Company Limited (HSI; Chinese: 恒生指數有限公司) is a private company in Hong Kong and wholly owned by Hang Seng Bank. HSI was founded in 1984 and is the major provider of stock market indexes on Hong Kong and China stock markets such as in Shanghai and Shenzhen.

== Products ==
HSI produces stock market indexes under 5 categories:

- Market Cap-weighted Indexes
- Factor & Strategy Indexes
- Sector Indexes
- Sustainability Indexes
- Fixed Income Indexes

Currently, the HSI produced indexes comprises over 400 real-time and daily indexes. The most famous and popular referenced is the Hang Seng Index.

== New Index Launch ==
=== 2011 ===
In February, HSI launched the HSI Volatility index or "VHSI". This index models on the lines of the Chicago Board Options Exchange VIX index. VHSI measures the 30-calendar-day expected volatility of the Hang Seng index using prices of options traded on the index.

=== 2017 ===
In November, HSI has launched three Stock Connect Hong Kong Indexes.

=== 2018 ===
In January, HSI has launched Hang Seng SCHK New Economy Index.

=== 2020 ===
HSI launched the Hang Seng Tech Index, which tracks companies like Tencent, Meituan Dianping and Xiaomi, on 27 July 2020.

== See also ==
- Hang Seng Bank
- Hang Seng Index
