= Lee Quo-wei =

Hong Kong businessman

The Honourable Sir Quo-wei Lee CBE GBM JP
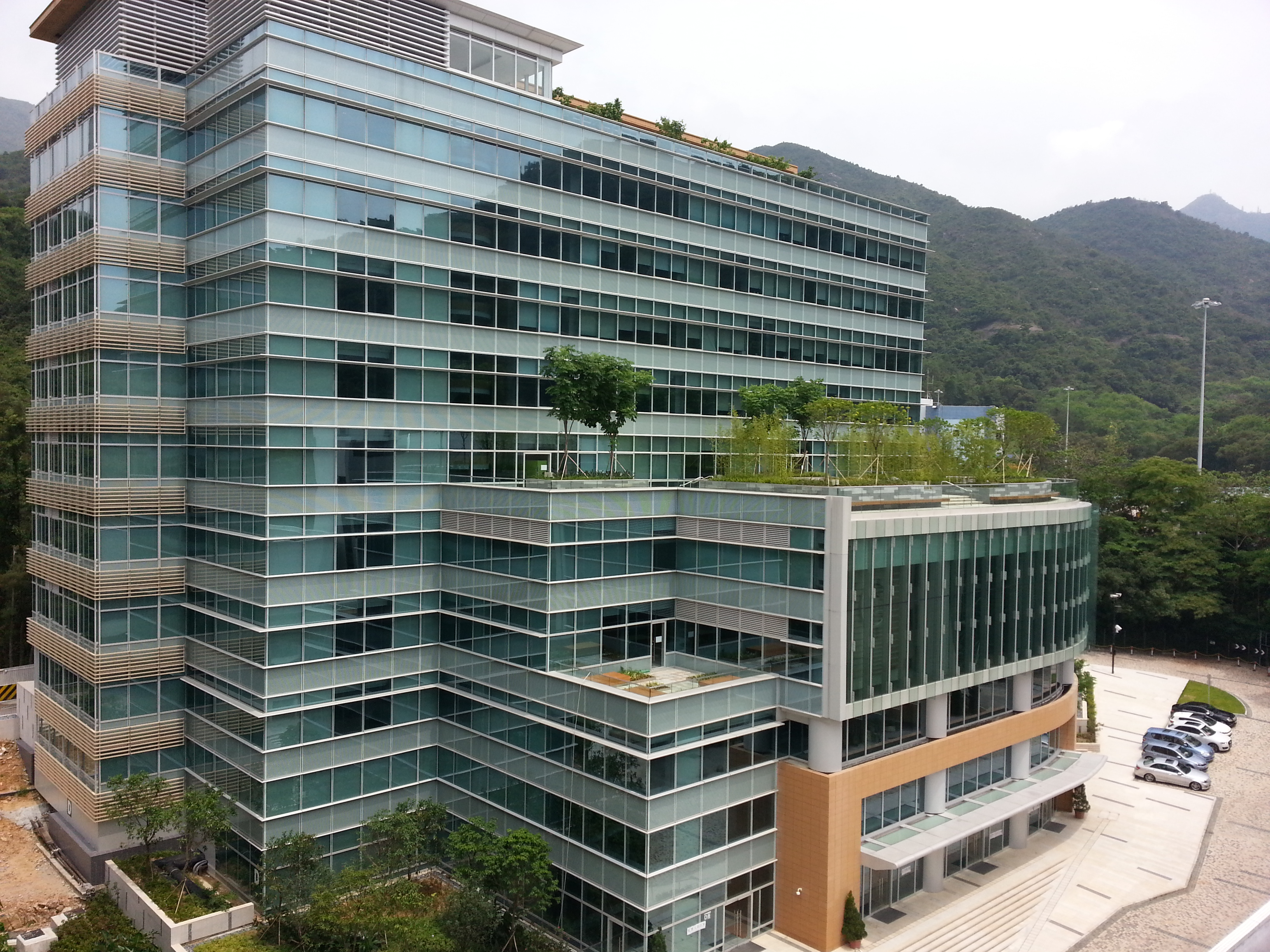

Executive Chairman of Hang Seng Bank
- In office 1983-1996

Chancellor of Hang Seng School of Commerce
- In office 1979-1994
- Succeeded by: Au Siu-kee

Personal details
- Born: 5 August 1918 Macau
- Died: 10 August 2013 (aged 95) Sha Tin, Hong Kong

Sir Quo-wei Lee CBE GBM JP (Chinese: 利國偉; pinyin: Lì Guówěi; 5 August 1918 – 10 August 2013), with family roots in Kaiping, Guangdong, China, was a prominent Hong Kong businessman who served as Chairman of Hang Seng Bank and Chinese University of Hong Kong. Lee was awarded Honorary Fellow of the Hong Kong Securities and Investment Institute (HKSI) in 2006. He was one of the four co-founders of the Ho Leung Ho Lee Foundation, which promotes the development of science and technology in China.

Lee was created Commander of the Order of the British Empire in 1977, and made a Knight Bachelor in 1988. In the same year, he was also named as the head of the Hong Kong Stock Exchange. He was awarded a Grand Bauhinia Medal in 1997. He died 10 August 2013 at the Prince of Wales Hospital in Hong Kong.

Academic offices
Preceded by Yuet-keung Kan	Chairman of the Council of the Chinese University of Hong Kong; 1982–1997	Succeeded by Lee Hon-chiu
