= Hang Seng Bank =

Hong Kong Bank

Hang Seng Bank Limited

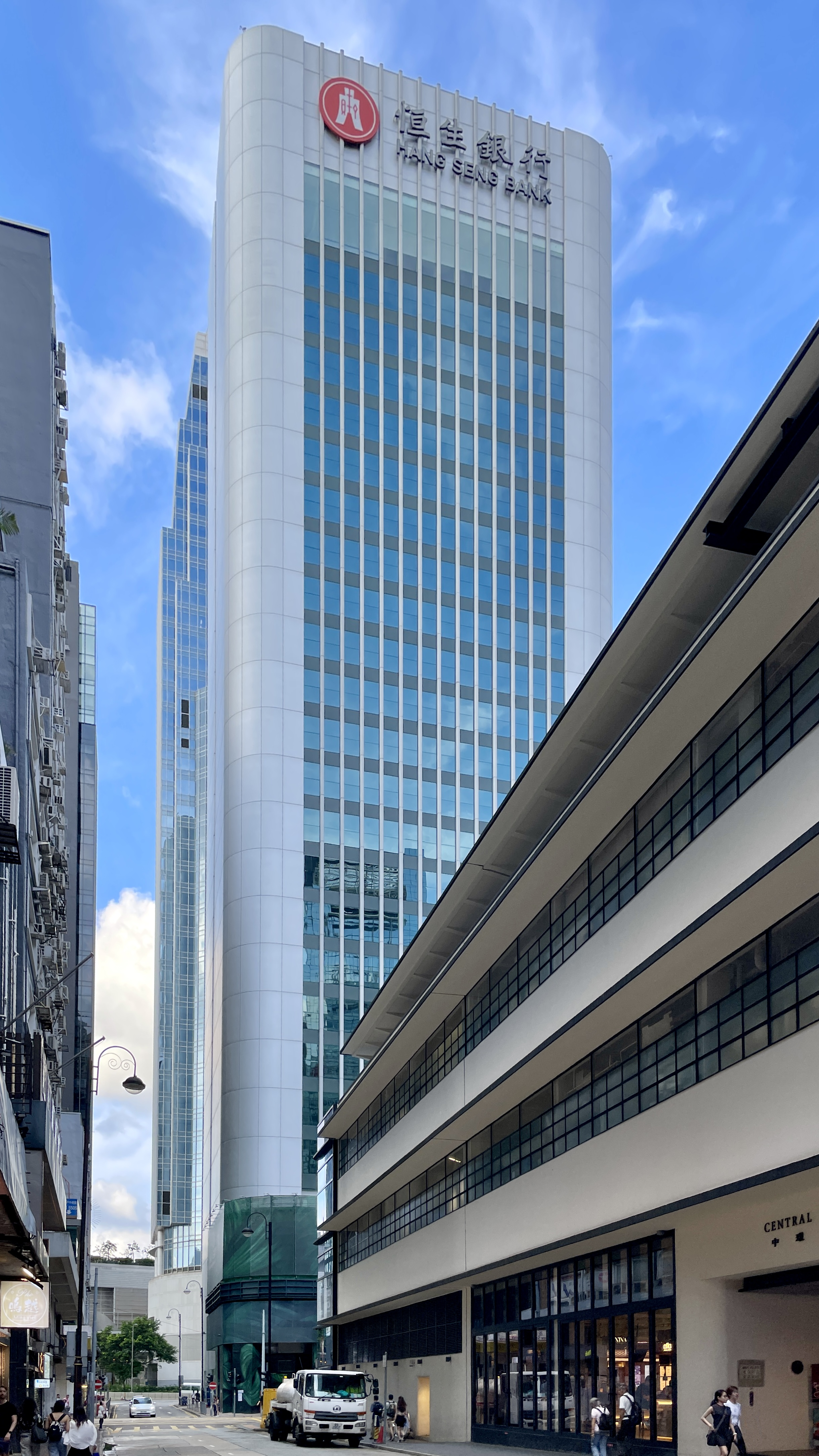
- Headquarters in Hong Kong
- Native name: 恒生銀行有限公司
- Type: Subsidiary (formerly public)
- Traded as: SEHK: 11 (1972-2026)
- Industry: Finance and insurance
- Founded: 3 March 1933; 93 years ago
- Founders: Lam Bing Yim, Ho Sin Hang, Leung Chik Wai, Ho Tim, and Ho, Lian Shen
- Headquarters: Hang Seng Bank Headquarters Building, Central, Hong Kong
- Key people: Edward Cheng (chairman); Luanne Lim (vice-chairman and CEO)
- Products: Financial services
- Operating income: ▲HK$36,764 million (2024)
- Net income: ▲HK$18,369 million (2024)
- Total assets: ▲HK$1,795,196 million (2024)
- Total equity: ▲HK$169,564 million (2024)
- Number of employees: 6928 (2024)
- Parent: HSBC (100%)
- Website: hangseng.com

Hang Seng Bank
- Traditional Chinese: 恒生銀行
- Simplified Chinese: 恒生银行
- Literal meaning: ever-growing bank
Transcriptions
Standard Mandarin
- Hanyu Pinyin: Héngshēng Yínháng
Yue: Cantonese
- Yale Romanization: Hàhngsāng Ngàhnhòhng
- Jyutping: Hang4sang1 Ngan4hong4

Hang Seng Bank Limited
- Traditional Chinese: 恒生銀行有限公司
- Simplified Chinese: 恒生银行有限公司
Transcriptions
Standard Mandarin
- Hanyu Pinyin: Héngshēng Yínháng Yǒuxiàn gōngsī
Yue: Cantonese
- Yale Romanization: Hàhngsāng Ngàhnhòhng Yáuhhaahn Gūngsī
- Jyutping: Hang4sang1 Ngan4hong4 Jau5haan6 Gung1si1

Hang Seng Bank Limited (Chinese: 恒生銀行有限公司) is a Hong Kong–based banking and financial services company with headquarters in Central, Hong Kong. It is a wholly owned subsidiary of the HSBC Group.

Hang Seng Bank is a commercial bank whose major business activities include retail banking, wealth management, commercial banking, treasury services, and private banking. Hang Seng Bank operates a network of around 260 service outlets in Hong Kong. It also has a wholly owned subsidiary in mainland China, Hang Seng Bank (China) Limited, which has a network of 46 branches and sub branches.

It established the Hang Seng Index as a public service in 1969 and this stock market index is now generally known as the primary indicator of the Hong Kong stock market.

== History ==
In 1933, business partners Lam Bing Yim (林炳炎), Ho Sin Hang, Sheng Tsun Lin (盛春霖), and Leung Chik Wai (梁植偉) founded Hang Seng Ngan Ho, the predecessor of Hang Seng Bank, in Hong Kong. Hang Seng means "ever-growing" in Cantonese. It commenced business as a simple money-changing shop at 70 Wing Lok Street, Sheung Wan, on 3 March 1933. In 1952, Hang Seng Bank became a private company and embarked on commercial banking. Hang Seng Bank converted into a public company in 1960. In 1965, Hang Seng Bank suffered a bank run which depleted almost one-quarter of its reserves. As a result, The Hongkong and Shanghai Banking Corporation (HSBC) acquired a 51% controlling interest in Hang Seng Bank, which it later increased to 62.14%.

In 1969, the Hang Seng Index was introduced as a public service. The index is now generally known as an indicator of the Hong Kong stock market. Hang Seng Bank was listed on the Stock Exchange of Hong Kong (SEHK) in 1972. In 1981, Hang Seng Bank was given permission to run branches in MTR stations. Hang Seng Bank began to extend its business to China in 1985, with the opening of a representative office in Shenzhen. Ten years later, Hang Seng Bank opened its first Chinese branch in Guangzhou.

In 2002, Hang Seng Bank began to launch personal e-banking in mainland China. Hang Seng Bank opened its branch in Macau in 2003. In 2006, Hang Seng Bank received authorisation to get ready for the formation of its mainland China subsidiary bank. Within the same year, Hang Seng Bank introduced a brand revitalisation program and presented a new company slogan – Managing wealth for you, with you.

The China Banking Regulatory Commission (CBRC) authorised the formation of Hang Seng Bank (China) Limited, the mainland China subsidiary bank of Hang Seng Bank on 28 May 2007. In November, Hang Seng Bank opened its new Hong Kong office at MegaBox, Kowloon Bay. Hang Seng Bank became the first bank in Hong Kong to fix the renminbi (RMB) prime rate in 2010.

In February 2012, Hang Seng Bank introduced the world's first RMB gold exchange-traded fund (ETF). The brand value of Hang Seng Bank was ranked 65th globally in the 2012 Brand Finance Banking 500, the highest ranking for Hong Kong banks.

In October 2025, HSBC, the majority shareholder of Hang Seng Bank, announced that it would privatise Hang Seng Bank by purchasing the 38% that it did not already own, and take the company off the SEHK after completion. On 8 January 2026, the proposal was approved by Hang Seng Bank's shareholders. The High Court approved HSBC's proposal on 23 January 2026, and the company was delisted on 27 January 2026.

== Overview ==
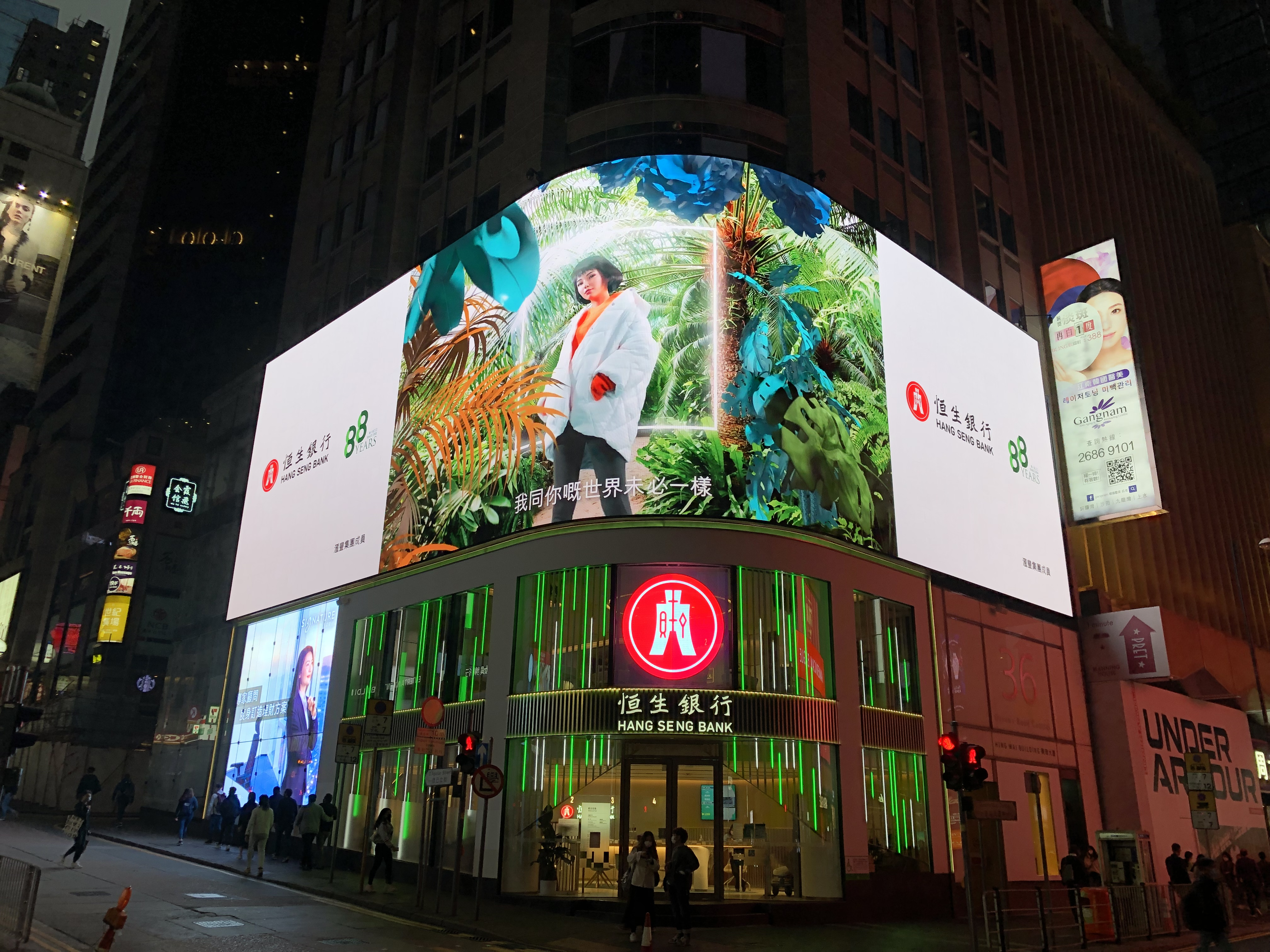
Central Branch

Hang Seng Bank is a commercial bank whose major business activities include retail banking and wealth management, corporate and commercial banking, treasury services, and private banking. Hang Seng Bank operates a network of around 260 service outlets in Hong Kong. Hang Seng Bank is the only local bank to offer extensive branch services along Mass Transit Railway (MTR) stations to better serve its customers.

Hang Seng Bank established its wholly owned subsidiary, Hang Seng Bank (China) Limited, in 2007. The subsidiary runs a mainland China network of 46 outlets in Beijing, Shanghai, Guangzhou, Shenzhen, Dongguan, Fuzhou, Nanjing, Hangzhou, Ningbo, Tianjin, Kunming, Foshan, Zhongshan, Huizhou, Xiamen, Zhuhai and Jiangmen with 12 branches and 34 sub-branches. For foreign currency wholesale business, Hang Seng Bank maintains branches in Shenzhen and Macau.

The current chairperson is Mr. Edward Cheng. The current Vice-Chairman and chief executive officer (CEO) is Ms. Luanne Lim.

=== Current leadership ===
- Chairman: Edward Cheng (since May 2025)
- Chief Executive: Luanne Lim (since October 2025)

Logo of Hang Seng Bank from 1954 to 1996

=== List of former chairmen ===
Role of chairman began in 1952, after incorporation as a bank

1. Ho Sin-hang (1952–1983)
2. Sir Lee Quo-wei (1983–1996)
3. David Eldon (1998–2005)
4. Michael Smith (2005–2007)
5. Raymond Ch'ien (2007–2021)
6. Irene Lee (2021–2025)

=== List of former CEOs ===
Role of CEO / general manager began in 1952, after incorporation as a bank

1. Ho Tim (1952–1967)
2. Sir Lee Quo-wei (1967–1987)
3. Ho Tak-ching (1987–1993)
4. Alexander Au (1993–1998)
5. Vincent Cheng (1998–2005)
6. Raymond Or (2005–2009)
7. Margaret Leung (2009–2012)
8. Rose Lee (2012–2017)
9. Louisa Cheang (2017–2021)
10. Diana Cesar (2021–2025)
