= Hang Seng Composite Index Series =

- Foundation: 2001; 25 years ago
- Operator: Hong Kong Stock Exchange
- Exchanges: Hong Kong Stock Exchange
- Trading symbol: HSCI
- Constituents: 480
- Type: Large cap, Mid cap and Small cap
- Weighting method: Free float adjusted
- Website: www.hsi.com.hk/eng/indexes/all-indexes/hsci

The Hang Seng Composite Index is a stock market index of the Stock Exchange of Hong Kong and was launched in 2001. It offers an equivalent of Hong Kong market benchmark that covers around the top 95th percentile of the total market capitalisation of companies listed on the Main Board of the Stock Exchange of Hong Kong ("SEHK").

Its index calculation adopts the freefloat-adjusted market capitalisation methodology, and can be used as a basis for index funds, mutual funds as well as performance benchmarks. Its arguable that the composite index is a better reflection on the overall market performance than the more popular Hang Seng Index, which only cover 50 stocks as opposed to over 480 stocks in the composite index.

== Sub-index ==
The Hang Seng Composite Index can be further dividend into 2 group of indexes : 1 on industry sector and 1 on market capitalisation.

=== Industry sector index series ===
There are 11 sub-indexes per industry sector:

- Energy
- Materials
- Industrial Goods
- Consumer Goods
- Consumer Services
- Telecommunications
- Utilities
- Financials
- Properties & Construction
- Information Technology
- Conglomerates

=== Market capitalisation index series ===
There are 3 indexes on market capitalisation :LargeCap, MidCap and SmallCap Indexes, which cover the top 80%, the next 15% and the remaining 5% respectively of the total market capitalisation of the Hang Seng Composite Index.

- Hang Seng Hong Kong LargeCap Index
- Hang Seng Hong Kong MidCap Index
- Hang Seng Hong Kong SmallCap Index

== See also ==
- Hang Seng Index
