= Lo Ying-shek =

Hong Kong businessman

- 羅鷹石
- Born: 1913; Chaozhou, China
- Died: 2006 (aged 92–93)
- Occupation: Businessman
- Known for: Creating Hong Kong real estate company Great Eagle Holdings
- Spouse: Lo To Lee Kwan
- Children: 9

Lo Ying-shek (Chinese: 羅鷹石) (1913–2006) was a Hong Kong real estate businessman who co-founded Great Eagle Holdings in 1963 with his wife, Lo To Lee Kwan (羅杜莉君).

== Early life ==
Lo was born in Chaozhou, China, in 1913 and accompanied his father to Thailand to make a living in the groceries and textiles trading industry. After marrying To Lee Kwan, he returned to Hong Kong in 1938 and opened a trading shop for the Lo family.

== Career ==
In 1963, Lo decided to move into the real estate business and established The Great Eagle Company. The name of the company was derived from the names of Lo and his wife.

The company was listed on the Hong Kong Stock Exchange in 1972, which contributed to the family amassing a fortune that became one of the largest in Asia.

His handling of family succession of Great Eagle Holdings has been cited as a case study in the research of Chinese family businesses and was seen as a successful model that was emulated by Li Ka-shing.

== Personal life and family ==
Lo died in 2006 and his children engaged in an extended legal fight over control of his property empire.

He had nine children, including:

- Lo Yuk-sui (羅旭瑞), his second-oldest son, chairs the HKSE-listed Century City International, parent of Regal Hotels International
  - Lo's Granddaughter, through her father Lo Yuk-sui, Poman Lo (羅寶文) is the Vice Chairman of Century City International Holdings Limited and Regal Hotels International Holdings Limited
- Lo Ka-shui (羅嘉瑞), his third-oldest son, was a medical doctor who is the currently Chairman and Managing Director of Great Eagle Holdings Limited, and the Executive Chairman of Langham Hospitality Group
- Vincent Lo (羅康瑞), his fourth-oldest son, is the chairman of Shui On Land, known for its investments in Mainland China such as Shanghai's Xintiandi district; married beauty pageant Loletta Chu (朱玲玲), ex-wife of businessman and politician Timothy Fok (霍震霆)
- Lo Kai-shui (羅啟瑞), his youngest son, was the former Deputy Managing Director of Great Eagle Holdings and now controlling shareholder of HKSE-listed SFK Construction
