= Jack So =

Chairman of the Board of Airport Authority Hong Kong

The Honourable Jack So GBM GBS JP
- 蘇澤光
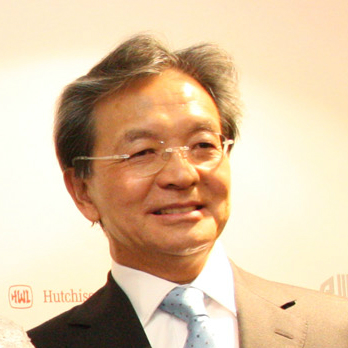
- Born: 1945 (age 80–81); Guangzhou, China
- Education: University of Hong Kong
- Occupation: Chairman of the Airport Authority Hong Kong

Chinese name
- Traditional Chinese: 蘇澤光
- Simplified Chinese: 苏泽光
Transcriptions
Standard Mandarin
- Hanyu Pinyin: Sū Zéguāng
Yue: Cantonese
- Jyutping: sou1 zaak6 gwong1

Jack So Chak-kwong, GBM, GBS, OBE, JP (traditional Chinese: 蘇澤光; simplified Chinese: 苏泽光) is the chairman of the Board of Airport Authority Hong Kong from June 2015. He is a former chairman and executive director of the Hong Kong Trade Development Council (HKTDC), former chairman and Chief Executive of the MTR Corporation, and former deputy chairman and Group managing director of PCCW.

In October 2013, he was appointed Chairman of the Consultative Committee on Economic and Trade Co-operation between Hong Kong and the Mainland. In January 2013 he was appointed a non-official member of the Economic Development Commission, and Convenor of its Working Group on Convention and Exhibition Industries and Tourism.

He was the Chairman of the Hong Kong Philharmonic Society, Chairman of Harrow International School Hong Kong, member of the Chinese People's Political Consultative Conference, Honorary Consultant to the Mayor of San Francisco, International Business Advisor to the Mayor of Beijing, and a member of Lantau Development Advisory Committee of Hong Kong Government.

He is an independent non-executive Director of AIA Group and China Resources Power, and senior advisor to Credit Suisse, Greater China. So is a former independent director of HSBC and Cathay Pacific.

A Justice of Peace, So were awarded the Gold Bauhinia Star in 2011 and the Grand Bauhinia Medal in 2017.

== Early years ==
So was born in Guangzhou, China on 1945. He went to La Salle College and the University of Hong Kong and obtained a diploma in economics from Cambridge University, UK.

== Career ==
So began his career with the Hong Kong Government. He then joined the private sector in 1978 and held various senior positions in stockbroking, banking and property development.

He served as executive director of the Hong Kong Trade Development Council (TDC) from 1985 to 1992, and the chairman from 2007 to 2015.

So was the chairman and Chief Executive of the MTR Corporation from 1995 to 2003. He was deputy chairman and Group managing director of PCCW from 2003 to 2007.

He is a non-executive Director of American International Assurance and China Resources Power, and senior advisor to Credit Suisse, Greater China. So was an independent director of HSBC from 2000 to 2007 and Cathay Pacific from 2002 to 2015.

In the political aspect, So is a member of the Chinese People's Political Consultative Conference from 2008 to 2018. He was an International Business Advisor to the Mayor of Beijing, and was appointed Honorary Consultant to the Mayor of San Francisco in 2013. He was also appointed by the HKSAR Government as Chairman of the Film Development Council from April 2007 to March 2013.

So is an Honorary Doctorate in Social Sciences at the University of Hong Kong (HKU). He was appointed Member of The University Council in 2000 and served as the Chairman of The university's Campus Development & Planning Committee from 2006 to 2012, and was responsible for the building of HKU's new Centennial Campus.

== Awards and honours ==
- Honorable Decorations in Social Science from the University of Hong Kong (2011)
- Gold Bauhinia Star (Hong Kong/2011)
- Grand Bauhinia Medal (Hong Kong/2017)

== Controversies ==
=== Panama Papers ===
So's name is found among the Panama Papers, including as an owner of an offshore company Jaderich Limited and as a stock holder of Solid Foundation Limited (SFL). He refused to reveal the business nature of Jarderich Ltd, when he was enquired by the local media. He only stated the company has been inactive for year.

Business positions
Preceded by H. R. Mathers	Chairman of the MTR Corporation Limited; 1995–2003	Succeeded by Raymond Chien
New title	Chief Executive Officer of the MTR Corporation Limited; 1995–2003	Succeeded by Chow Chung-kong
Political offices
Preceded by Peter Woo	Chairman of the Hong Kong Trade Development Council; 2007–2015	Succeeded by Vincent Lo
Preceded by Vincent Lo	Chairman of the Hong Kong Airport Authority; 2015–	Incumbent
