= Chow Chung-kong =

Hong Kong businessman and government appointee

The Honourable Sir Chung-kong Chow GBM，GBS，JP，FREng，FCGI，FIChemE
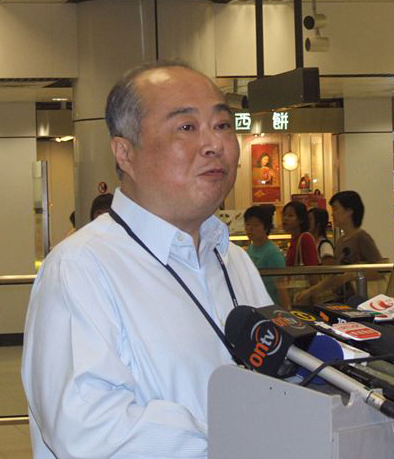

Chairman of the Urban Renewal Authority
- Incumbent
- Assumed office 1 May 2019
- Preceded by: Victor So Hing-who

Non-Official Member of the Executive Council of Hong Kong
- In office 1 July 2012 – 30 June 2022
- Appointed by: Leung Chun-ying; Carrie Lam

Chairman of the Hong Kong Exchanges and Clearing
- In office 24 April 2012 – 25 April 2018
- Preceded by: Ronald Arculli
- Succeeded by: Laura Cha

CEO of the MTR Corporation
- In office 1 December 2003 – 31 December 2011
- Chairman: Raymond Chien
- Preceded by: Jack So
- Succeeded by: Jay Walder

Personal details
- Born: 9 September 1950 (age 76) Hong Kong

Sir Chung-kong Chow (Chinese: 周松崗; Jyutping: zau1 cung4 gong1; born 9 September 1950), also known as Chow Chung-kong and C.K. Chow, is a Hong Kong businessman and government appointee. He is currently chairman of the Urban Renewal Authority and is a former non-official member of the Executive Council of Hong Kong. He was also chairman of Hong Kong Exchanges and Clearing, which owns the Hong Kong Stock Exchange.

Previously, he was chief executive officer of the MTR Corporation, and was chief executive officer of Brambles Industries, a global support services company listed in the United Kingdom and Australia, until resigning in 2003 after shareholder accusations of mismanagement. From 1997 to 2001, he was chief executive of GKN PLC, a leading engineering company based in the United Kingdom and before that he spent 20 years with the BOC Group PLC and was appointed a director of its board and chief executive of its Gases Division in 1993.

Chow is a chartered engineer and holds BS and MS degrees in Chemical Engineering from the University of Wisconsin–Madison and the University of California-Davis respectively. He also holds an MBA degree from The Chinese University of Hong Kong and attended the six-week Advanced Management Program of Harvard Business School. He was awarded an Honorary Doctor of Engineering degree by the University of Bath in 2001.

Chow was knighted in the United Kingdom in 2000 for his contribution to industry. He is a member of the Council of the Hong Kong Institute of Certified Public Accountants, the Hong Kong Tourism Board, the Council of The Chinese University of Hong Kong and as the council's representative to serve on the Board of Trustees of its Shaw College.

Chow is also a member of the general committee of the Hong Kong General Chamber of Commerce, and the Shenzhen Municipal Committee of the Chinese People's Political Consultative Conference. He was a non-executive director of Standard Chartered and until the end of 2010 was non-executive chairman of Standard Chartered Hong Kong. He was appointed chairman of HKEx in April 2012 and as a Fellow at the Royal Academy of Engineering in 2001.

The Hong Kong media once described Chow as one of the most powerful Chinese men in the western world.

== See also ==
- Overseas Chinese

Business positions
Preceded by Jack So	Chief Executive Officer of the MTR Corporation Limited; 2003–2012	Succeeded by Jay Walder
