= Jay Walder =

Chief Executive Officer of MTR Corporation

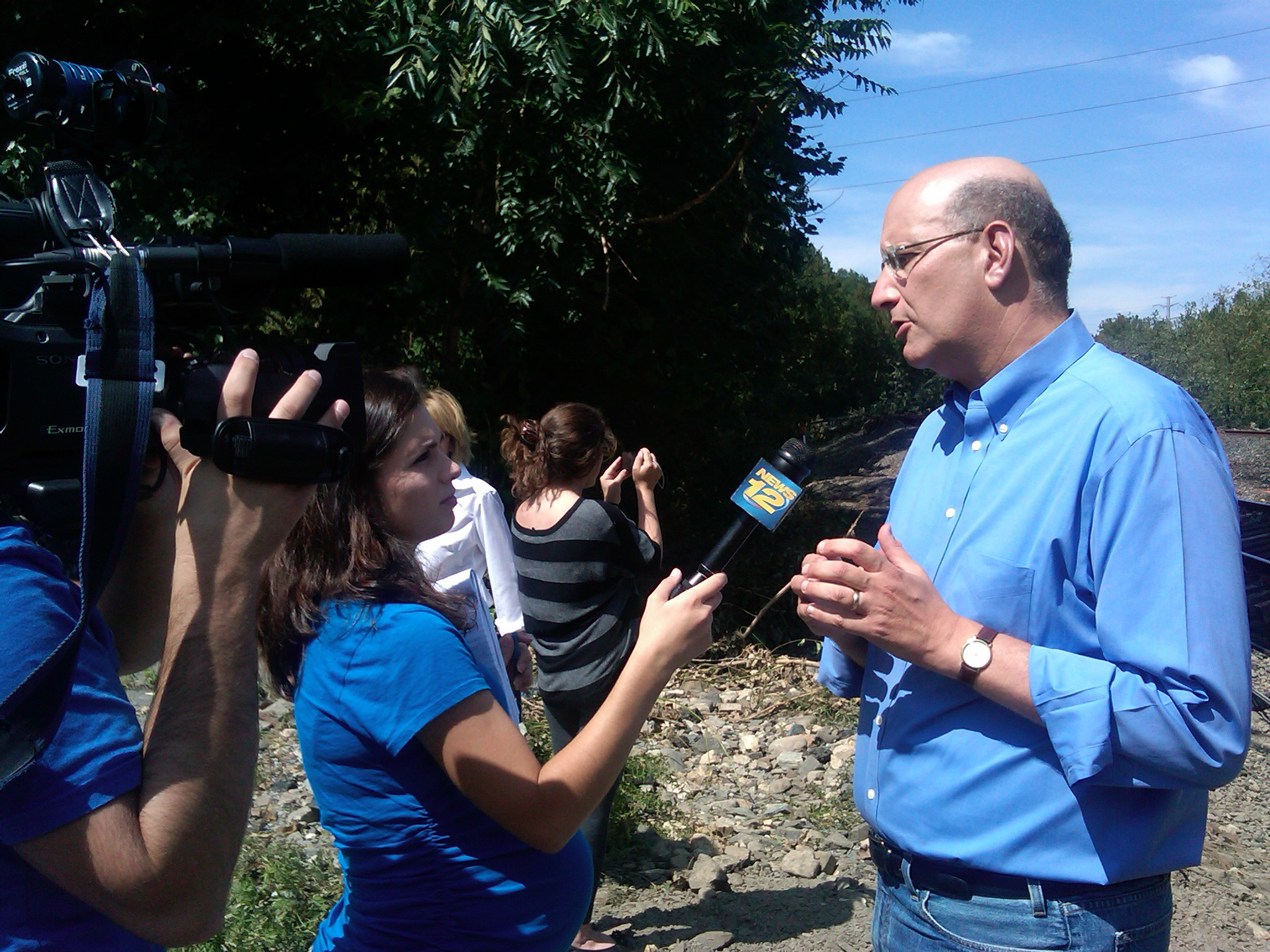
- Walder speaks with News 12 regarding the Port Jervis Line after Hurricane Irene

CEO of the MTR Corporation
- In office 1 January 2012 – 15 August 2014
- Chairman: Raymond Chien
- Preceded by: Chow Chung-kong
- Succeeded by: Lincoln Leong

10th Chairman & CEO of the Metropolitan Transportation Authority
- In office October 5, 2009 – October 21, 2011
- Governor: David Paterson; Andrew Cuomo
- Preceded by: H. Dale Hemmerdinger (as Chairman); Helena E. Williams (as Interim CEO); Elliot G. Sander (as CEO)
- Succeeded by: Joseph J. Lhota

Personal details
- Born: 1959 (age 66–67) Indianapolis, Indiana, U.S.
- Education: Binghamton University; Harvard University

Jay Walder is an American transportation executive. He was the CEO of Hyperloop One, an American transportation technology company. He has been the CEO of Motivate, a bike sharing company, and of the Hong Kong transit company MTR Corporation (MTRC), before resigning from that position in July 2014.

Before joining MTRC, Walder was the chairman and chief executive officer of the Metropolitan Transportation Authority in the New York metropolitan area, the largest transit agency in the United States.

Prior to his service at the MTA, Walder was the managing director for finance and planning at Transport for London until 2007, and is credited with the introduction of the Oyster card and with drafting London's successful bid for the 2012 Summer Olympics.

== Biography ==
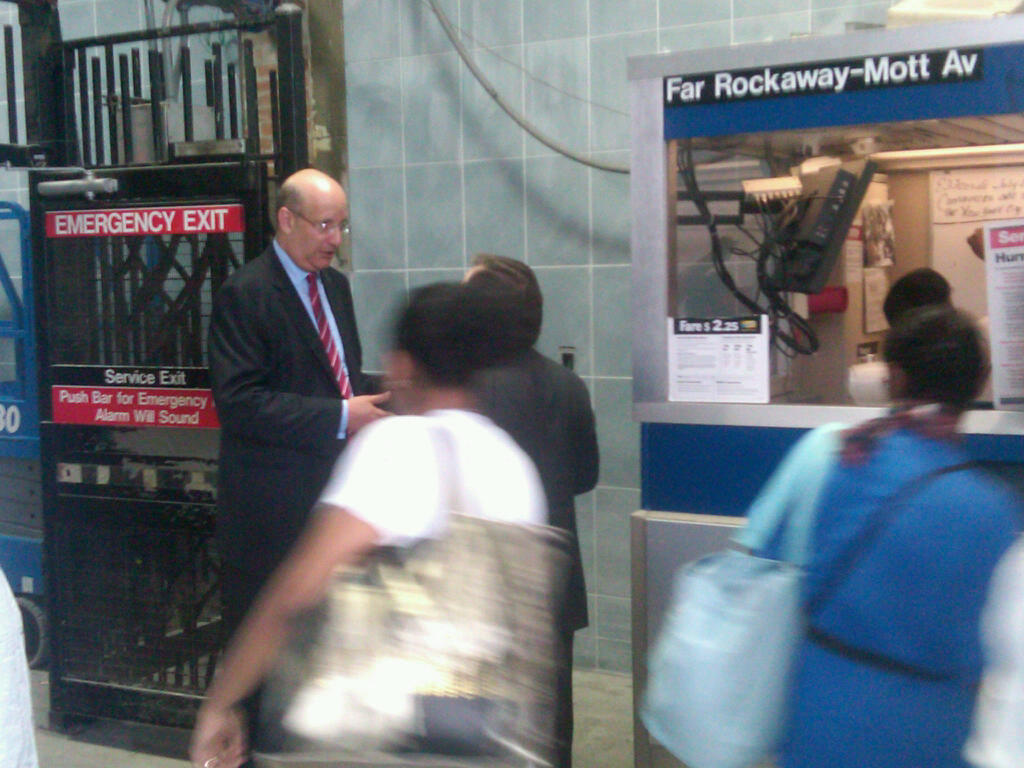
Walder greets Hurricane Irene evacuees at the Far Rockaway – Mott Avenue subway station

Walder was born in Indianapolis and grew up in the Rockaways in the New York City borough of Queens, where he attended Beach Channel High School. He attended Harpur College at Binghamton University, and received a Masters in Public Policy from the John F. Kennedy School of Government at Harvard University.

== Career ==
Walder worked for the MTA from 1983 to 1995 holding several leadership positions, including chief financial officer. He was a lecturer in public policy at John F. Kennedy School of Government at Harvard from 1995 to 2000, during which time he spent a year as a visiting lecturer at the National University of Singapore. From 2001 to 2007 he was managing director for finance and planning at Transport for London. He was a partner at McKinsey & Company London from 2007 to 2009. In 2009, New York State Gov. David Paterson appointed Walder chairman and CEO, after firing Elliot G. Sander, of the MTA (the positions of chairman and CEO of the authority had recently merged when the appointment was made).

On July 11, 2011, Walder announced his resignation from MTA, effective in October 2011, when he moved to MTR Corporation (MTRC) in Hong Kong. He left on October 21, 2011. He officially took over as CEO of MTRC on January 1, 2012. Walder announced he would step down from the position as MTR CEO in July 2014. Christopher O. Ward was also ousted by Cuomo at the same time, removing Paterson appointee's.

In October 2014, Walder was named CEO of Motivate, the company that runs some bike share systems in North America. His appointment came with Motivate's announcement of the Bikeshare Holdings acquisition, promising new leadership, $30 million infusion of cash, relocation of headquarters from Portland to NY, and immediate expansion for Citi Bike. In January 2015, Alta Bike Share changed its name to Motivate.

== Advisory boards ==
Walder is a member of MIT's visiting committee for the Department of Civil and Environmental Engineering and Harvard Kennedy School's Board of Advisors of the Taubman Center. In 2013, Walder gave the Gustav Pollak lecture in the John F. Kennedy Jr. Forum at Harvard, titled "From Queens to Hong Kong: More than Just a Train Ride". He was a Fellow of the Hong Kong Management Association, member of the General Committee of the Employers' Federation of Hong Kong, and a governor of the American Chamber of Commerce in Hong Kong. Walder served on International Association of Public Transport (UITP)'s Executive Board, the American Public Transit Association (APTA)'s Executive Committee, and the Eno Transportation Foundation's board of advisors.

== High-speed rail delays ==
In April 2014, at the Hong Kong transit company MTR Corporation, local newspapers revealed a two-year delay to the high-speed cross-border rail link. MTR Corp officials led by Walder were accused of concealing the progress of the project. Walder had been facing calls to quit after a report submitted to the legislative council said he had stopped the secretary for transport and housing from telling lawmakers about the delay. At the time it was also confirmed that Walder would not be given a new contract when it was due to expire in August 2015.

Political offices
Preceded by Dale Hemmerdinger	Chairman & CEO of the MTA; 2009-2011	Succeeded by Joseph J. Lhota
Business positions
Preceded by Chow Chung-kong	Chief Executive Officer of the MTR Corporation Limited; 2012–2014	Succeeded by Lincoln Leong
