= Katherine Lapp =

American politician

Executive Vice President of Harvard University
- In office October 2009 – 2022
- President: Drew Gilpin Faust; Lawrence Bacow
- Preceded by: Edward C. Forst
- Succeeded by: Meredith Weenick

Executive Director of Metropolitan Transportation Authority
- In office January 2002 – December 31, 2006
- Governor: George Pataki
- Preceded by: Marc V. Shaw
- Succeeded by: Elliot G. Sander

Personal details
- Born: 1957 Cedarhurst, New York
- Education: Fairfield, B.A. '78; Hofstra, J.D. '81

Katherine N. Lapp is an American lawyer, civil servant, and university executive. Notably, she served as Executive Vice President and Chief Administrative Officer of Harvard University from 2009 to 2022.

Prior to working at Harvard, Lapp had a distinguished career in leadership roles in city and state government in New York, including serving as executive director of the Metropolitan Transportation Authority, the transit agency serving the New York metropolitan area.

== Early life and education ==
Lapp was raised on Long Island, one of eleven children.

Lapp received her B.A. in 1978 from Fairfield University and her J.D. in 1981 from Hofstra University Deane School of Law.

She also has served on the board of trustees at Fairifeld and gave the university's commencement speech in 2010.

== Career ==
=== Government ===
Lapp served as Chief of Staff and Special Counsel to the Deputy Mayor for Public Safety under New York City Mayor David Dinkins from 1990 to 1993. Following Dinkins's loss to Rudy Giuliani, Lapp stayed in City Hall, serving as the New York City Criminal Justice Coordinator under Giuliani from 1994 to 1997. In this role, she worked alongside Giuliani and then-Police Commissioner William Bratton to streamline police operations and district attorney resources.

On November 26, 1997, Governor George Pataki nominated Lapp as to be New York State's Director of Criminal Justice and Commissioner of the Division of Criminal Justice Services. She served in that role from 1997 to 2001.

==== Metropolitan Transportation Authority ====
In 2002, Lapp was appointed executive director of the Metropolitan Transportation Authority by MTA Chairman Peter S. Kalikow. She served in this position through the end of the Pataki Administration in 2006. She was the first woman to hold the executive director position since the founding of the MTA in 1968.

As head of the MTA, Lapp oversaw day-to-day operations for the largest transportation network in the United States, which includes the New York City subway and bus system, Metro-North Railroad, the Long Island Rail Road, and several bridges and tunnels. She oversaw which 68,000 employees and a $10 billion annual budget in her time at the MTA.

As executive director, one of her hallmark accomplishments was the enhancement of the MTA's financial reporting process, which included four-year-ahead financial planning, incorporating periods for public comment and elected official input, as well as greater transparency in sharing financial data via the MTA's website.

In 2004, Lapp received a 22% pay increase while the MTA was facing a budget deficit and was seeking to raise fares.

Lapp was executive director during the 2005 New York City transit strike.

With incoming governor Eliot Spitzer set to take office, Lapp announced her resignation from the MTA on December 14, 2006, to make way for new leadership.

=== Higher education ===
Before being named to her position at Harvard, Lapp had been executive vice president for business operations for the University of California since 2007.

Lapp was announced as Harvard's Executive Vice President by then-President Drew Faust in August 2009. In this role, Lapp oversaw the financial, administrative, human resources, and capital planning aspects of Harvard's central office administration.

In 2015, Boston Magazine named Lapp Boston's 42nd Most Powerful Person. According to the magazine, "Lapp is overseeing Harvard's ambitious 10-year development plan in Allston, and having joined Massachusetts Governor (Charlie) Baker's MBTA advisory panel, she'll help determine Boston's transportation future as well."

Lapp left Harvard in Summer 2022 and was succeeded by Meredith Weenick, then-Vice President for Campus Services.

Preceded by Marc Shaw	Executive Director of the New York Metropolitan Transportation Authority; 2002 – 2007	Succeeded by Elliot G. Sander
