= Marvin Cheung =

Marvin Cheung 張建東

Member of the Legislative Council
- In office 9 October 1991 – 31 July 1995
- Appointed by: David Wilson

Personal details
- Born: Marvin Cheung Kin-tung; 20 November 1947 Hong Kong
- Died: 13 September 2014 (aged 67) Hong Kong, People's Republic of China
- Spouse: Sabrina Cheung
- Children: 2
- Education: St. Paul's Co-educational College
- Occupation: Accountant

Marvin Cheung Kin-tung, GBS OBE JP (traditional Chinese: 張建東; simplified Chinese: 张建东; pinyin: Zhāng Jiàndōng; Jyutping: zoeng1 gin3 dung1, 20 November 1947 – 13 September 2014) was a Non-official Member of the Executive Council of Hong Kong. He also held the position of Chairman of the Airport Authority Hong Kong and was a Council Member of the Open University of Hong Kong.

Cheung was born and educated in Hong Kong and qualified as a Chartered Accountant in the United Kingdom gaining honours in all parts of his professional examinations. In 2008 he was appointed by the Chief Executive to succeed Victor Fung as Chairman of the Airport Authority. In 2009 he became the non-executive director of HSBC Holdings. At the time of his death, he was also a non-executive Director of Hang Seng Bank, HKR International, Hong Kong Exchanges and Clearing and Sun Hung Kai Properties. Additionally, he represented Hong Kong on the Trustees Reviews Committee of the International Accounting Standards Board.

Cheung was a member of the Legislative Council, the Urban Council and District Boards. He also served as chairman of the Hong Kong Society of Accountants, Chairman of the Estate Agents Authority and Vice Chairman of the Mandatory Provident Fund Advisory Board, as well as Member of the Board of Inland Revenue, the Standing Committee on Company Law Reform, the Town Planning Board, the Consumer Council, the Council for the Performing Arts and other public service positions.

Cheung was conferred the Silver Bauhinia Star by the HKSAR in 2000 and later was elevated to Gold Bauhinia Star in 2008. He was also awarded an OBE by the Hong Kong government in 1994. He was awarded a Doctor of Business Administration, honoris causa, by Hong Kong Baptist University in 2003.

== Accountancy ==
By trade he was a Certified Public Accountant. He retired in 2003 as the chairman and CEO of KPMG Hong Kong and China. He held fellowships in both the Institute of Chartered Accountants in England and Wales, as well as the Hong Kong Institute of Certified Public Accountants.

== Education ==
He attended St Paul's Co-Educational College in Hong Kong. He was awarded the honorary doctorate of Business Administration by Hong Kong Baptist University in 2003.

== Affiliations ==
- Member of the Barristers Disciplinary Tribunal
- Member of the Greater Pearl River Delta Business Council
- Member of Operations Review Committee of ICAC
- Member of the Witness Protection Review Board
- Hon. Treasurer and Council Member of St. Paul's Co-Educational College
- Hon. Treasurer and Council Member of St. Stephen's Girls' College
- Board member of the Hong Kong International Film Society Ltd.

Political offices
Preceded by Victor Fung	Chairman of the Hong Kong Airport Authority; 2008–2014	Succeeded by Vincent Lo
