= Sports, Performing Arts, Culture and Publication (constituency) =

Hong Kong functional constituency

Sports, Performing Arts, Culture and Publication 體育、演藝、文化及出版界
- Functional constituency for the Legislative Council of Hong Kong
- Region: Hong Kong
- Electorate: 255

Current constituency
- Created: 1998
- Number of members: One
- Member: Kenneth Fok (Independent)

The Sports, Performing Arts, Culture and Publication functional constituency (Chinese: 體育、演藝、文化及出版界功能界別) is a functional constituency in the elections for the Legislative Council of Hong Kong. The constituency is composed of corporate members of the Sports Federation & Olympic Committee of Hong Kong, China, Hong Kong Sports Institute, Hong Kong Publishing Federation and other designated associations of performing arts, broadcasting and culture.

== Composition ==
After the major electoral overhaul in 2021, the Sports, Performing Arts, Culture and Publication functional constituency is composed of:

- Corporate members of the Sports Federation & Olympic Committee of Hong Kong, China
- Hong Kong Sports Institute Limited
- Corporate members of the Hong Kong Publishing Federation Limited entitled to vote at general meetings of the company
- 19 designated performing arts industry associations and local licensed broadcasting institutions and 114 designated cultural public institutions, associations and bodies.

== Return members ==
Election	Member	Party
1998	Timothy Fok	Independent
2000	Timothy Fok	Independent
2004	Timothy Fok	Independent
2008	Timothy Fok	Independent
2012	Ma Fung-kwok	New Forum
2016	Ma Fung-kwok	New Forum
2021	Kenneth Fok	Independent
2025	Kenneth Fok	Independent

== Electoral results ==
=== 2020s ===
2025 Legislative Council election: Sports, Performing Arts, Culture and Publication
Party	Candidate	Votes	%	±%
Independent	Kenneth Fok Kai-kong	193	85.02	−2.03
Independent	Lo Kwong-ping	34	14.98	
Majority		159	70.04	
Total valid votes		227	100.00	
Rejected ballots		3		
Turnout		230	90.20	+2.70
Registered electors		255		
Independent hold		Swing		

2021 Legislative Council election: Sports, Performing Arts, Culture and Publication
Party	Candidate	Votes	%	±%
Independent	Kenneth Fok Kai-kong	195	87.05	
Independent	William So Wai-leung	29	12.95	
Majority		166	74.10	+47.72
Total valid votes		224	100.00	
Rejected ballots		0		
Turnout		224	87.50	+6.44
Registered electors		257		
Independent gain from New Forum		Swing		

=== 2010s ===
2016 Hong Kong legislative election: Sports, Performing Arts, Culture and Publication
Party	Candidate	Votes	%	±%
New Forum	Ma Fung-kwok	1,389	63.19	–2.18
Independent	Adrian Chow Pok-yin	809	36.81	
Majority		580	26.38	
Total valid votes		2,198	100.00	
Rejected ballots		49		
Turnout		2,247	81.06	
Registered electors		2,772		
New Forum hold		Swing		

2012 Hong Kong legislative election: Sports, Performing Arts, Culture and Publication
Party	Candidate	Votes	%	±%
New Forum	Ma Fung-kwok	1,160	65.37	
Independent	Chow Chun-fai	477	28.19	
Independent	Siu See-kong	109	6.44	
Majority		683	37.18	
Total valid votes		1,746	100.00	
Rejected ballots		61		
Turnout		1,807	75.45	
Registered electors		2,395		
New Forum gain from Independent		Swing		

=== 2000s ===
2008 Hong Kong legislative election: Sports, Performing Arts, Culture and Publication
Party	Candidate	Votes	%	±%
Independent	Timothy Fok Tsun-ting	Unopposed		
Registered electors		2,208		
Independent hold		Swing		

2004 Hong Kong legislative election: Sports, Performing Arts, Culture and Publication
Party	Candidate	Votes	%	±%
Independent	Timothy Fok Tsun-ting	800	69.08	
Democratic	Lam Hon-kin	358	30.92	
Majority		442	38.16	
Total valid votes		1,158	100.00	
Rejected ballots		40		
Turnout		1,198	73.45	
Registered electors		1,631		
Independent hold		Swing		

2000 Hong Kong legislative election: Sports, Performing Arts, Culture and Publication
Party	Candidate	Votes	%	±%
Independent	Timothy Fok Tsun-ting	Unopposed		
Registered electors		1,282		
Independent hold		Swing		

=== 1990s ===
1998 Hong Kong legislative election: Sports, Performing Arts, Culture and Publication
Party	Candidate	Votes	%	±%
Independent	Timothy Fok Tsun-ting	561	68.50	
Democratic	Wu Chi-wai	258	31.50	
Majority		303	23.00	
Total valid votes		819	100.00	
Rejected ballots		40		
Turnout		846	77.83	
Registered electors		1,087		
Independent win (new seat)				
