= Kenneth Fok =

Hong Kong businessman (born 1979)

The Honourable Kenneth Fok Kai-kong JP
- 霍啟剛
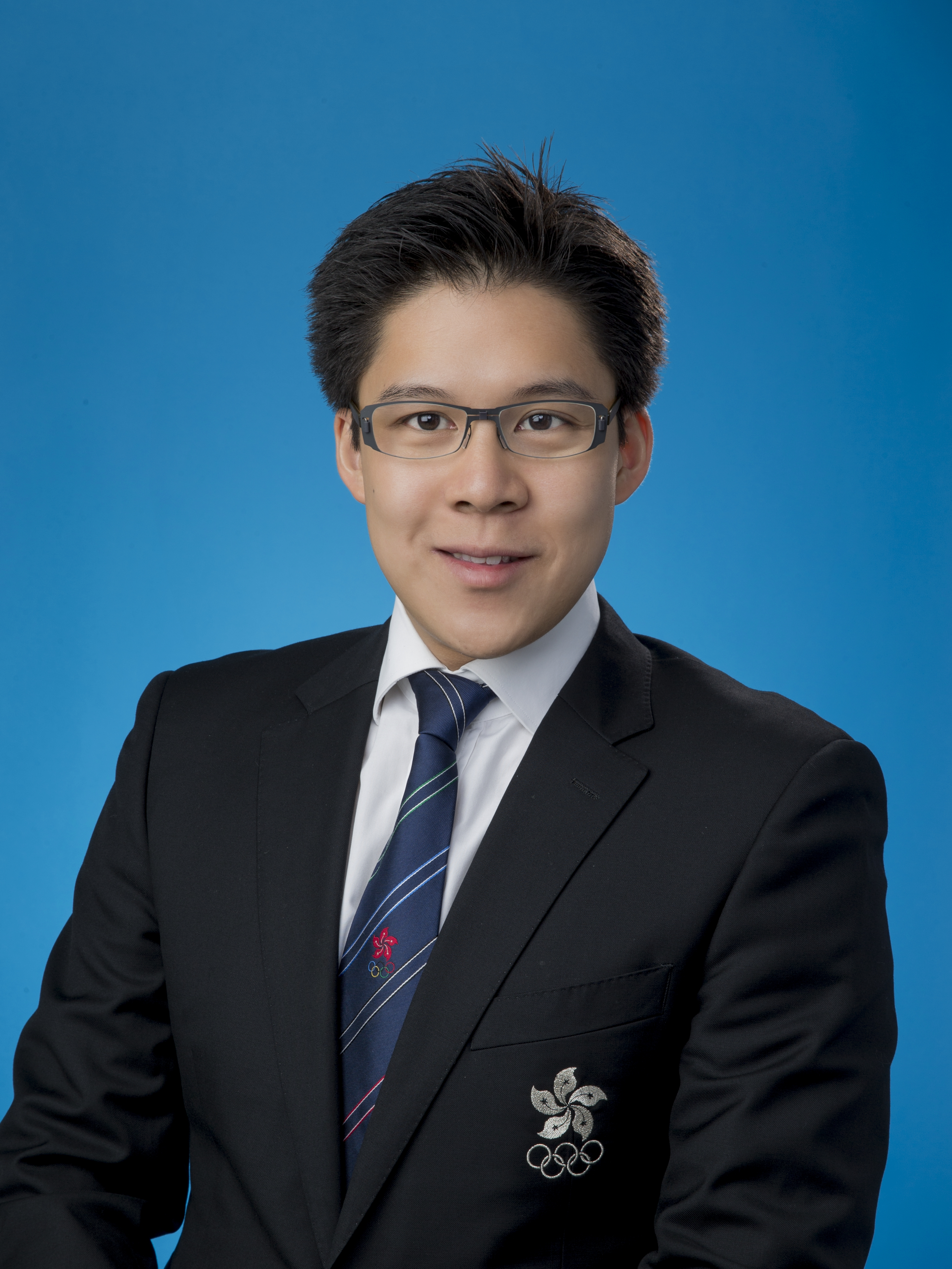
- Fok in 2019

Member of the Legislative Council
- Incumbent
- Assumed office 1 January 2022
- Preceded by: Ma Fung-kwok
- Constituency: Sports, Performing Arts, Culture and Publication

Personal details
- Born: 2 July 1979 (age 47) British Hong Kong
- Spouse: Guo Jingjing (m. 2012)
- Children: 3
- Parent(s): Timothy Fok; Loletta Chu
- Education: Pembroke College, Oxford (BA)

Kenneth Fok Kai-kong JP (Chinese: 霍啟剛; born 2 July 1979) is a Hong Kong businessman and politician. The eldest grandson of tycoon Henry Fok and eldest son of Timothy Fok, he is a member of the Legislative Council for the Sports, Performing Arts, Culture and Publication Functional Constituency since 2021. He is the vice president of the Fok Ying Tung Group, vice president of the Sports Federation & Olympic Committee of Hong Kong, China and a member of the National Committee of the Chinese People's Political Consultative Conference (CPPCC).

== Biography ==
Fok was born into a prominent pro-Beijing business family. His grandfather, Henry Fok, was a Hong Kong real estate developer, president of the Real Estate Developers Association of Hong Kong and Hong Kong Football Association, and was one of the first Hong Kong entrepreneurs to invest in mainland China, in the 1980s. He rose to become the vice chairman of the National Committee of the Chinese People's Political Consultative Conference (CPPCC). His father, Timothy Fok, was also president of the Hong Kong Football Association and the Sports Federation & Olympic Committee of Hong Kong, China, a member of the CPPCC National Committee and a former member of the Legislative Council for the Sports, Performing Arts, Culture and Publication functional constituency. His mother, Loletta Chu, was the winner of the 1977 Miss Hong Kong Pageant.

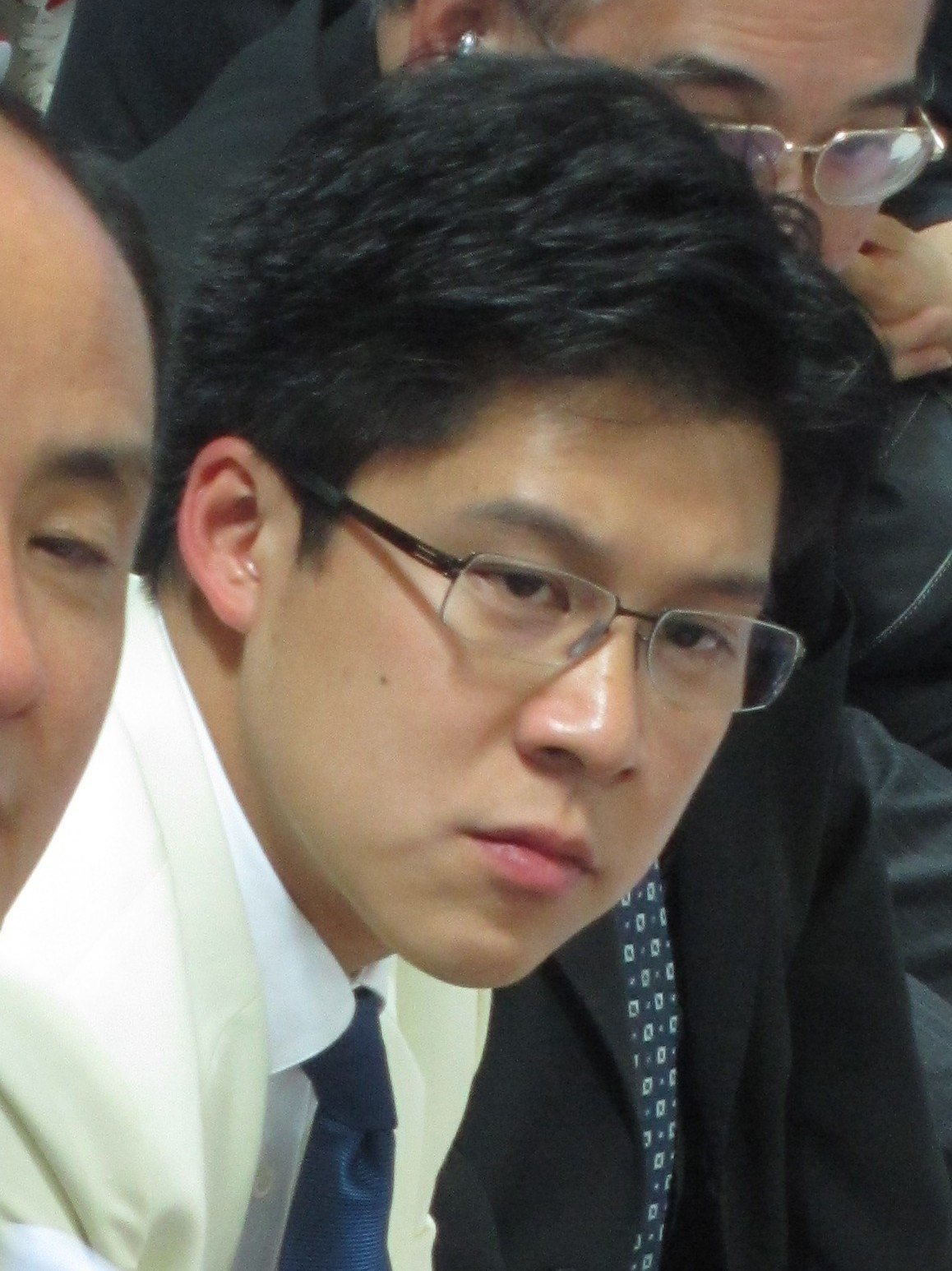
Fok in 2009 East Asian Games

Fok graduated from Pembroke College, Oxford, with a bachelor's degree in economics and management before returning to Hong Kong to join his family business and subsequently become vice president of the Fok Ying Tung Group. With his family's political background and influence in the sports development, he was appointed to serve on various government advisory and statutory bodies, including the chair of the Committee of Youth Activities in Hong Kong, member of the Youth Development Commission, Commission on Poverty, and Betting and Lotteries Commission; executive vice chair of Greater Bay Area Homeland Youth Community Foundation, standing committee member of Youth Committee of the Chinese General Chamber of Commerce, standing committee member of the All-China Youth Federation, and vice chairman of Tianjin Youth Federation and trustee of the China Oxford Scholarship Fund. Other public offices he holds include member of the Hong Kong Arts Development Council, adviser to the Association of Chinese Culture of Hong Kong, adviser to the Hong Kong Culture and Art Promotion Association and the chairman of Culture Action.

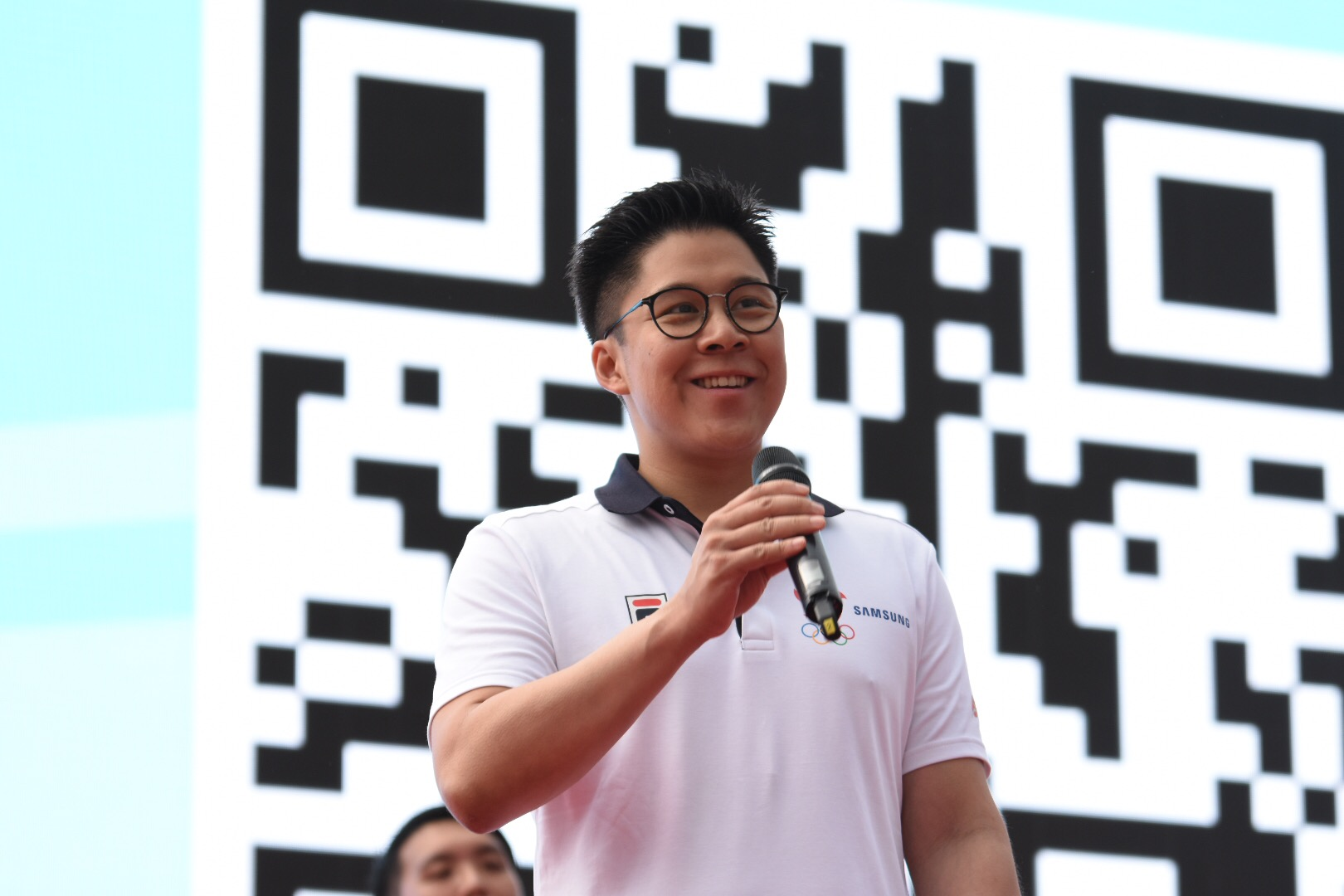
Fok in 2019

He is also vice chairman of Elite Sports Committee and ex-officio member of Sports Commission of the Home Affairs Bureau, vice president of the Sports Federation & Olympic Committee of Hong Kong, China, president of the Gymnastics Association of Hong Kong, China, director of Hong Kong Sports Institute, a committee member of the International Relations Committee of the Olympic Council of Asia, president of the Asian Electronic Sports Federation, and member of the International Experts Committee For Global Active City Asian Standard. His appointment as vice president of the Sports Federation & Olympic Committee of Hong Kong, China, where his father Timothy Fok is a long-time president, was scrutinised by the media, which claimed that Timothy Fok appointed his son without transparency, and that Kenneth Fok had no track record in any type of sporting achievement.

Fok was appointed member of the Tianjin Municipal Committee Member of the Chinese People’s Political Consultative Conference. He was also appointed as a part-time member of the Central Policy Unit during the Donald Tsang administration from 2008 to 2009. He was also appointed member of the National Committee of the Chinese People’s Political Consultative Conference, following the paths of his grandfather and father. In 2016, he was appointed Justice of the Peace by the Hong Kong government.

== Controversies ==
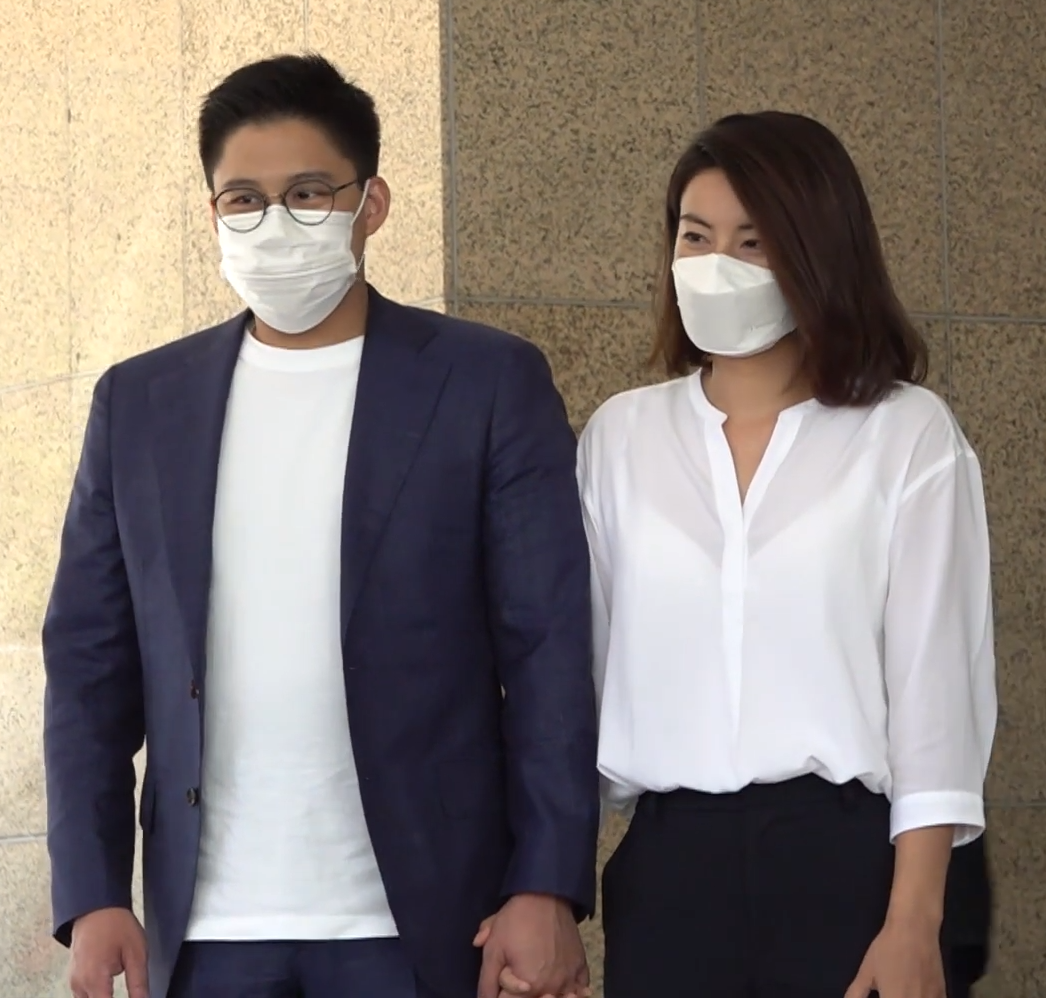
Fok with his wife Guo Jingjing (2020)

In December 2021, it was reported that Fok was eligible to vote four times in the 2021 Hong Kong legislative election, yielding 0.0366618% of the total voting value (elected seats), which is 7377 times more than the value of an average voter's total voting value. He was elected as a member of the Legislative Council following his win in the Sports, Performing Arts, Culture and Publication constituency.

On 5 January 2022, Carrie Lam announced new warnings and restrictions against social gathering ascribed to the potential for COVID-19 outbreaks. One day later, it was discovered that Fok had attended a birthday party hosted by Witman Hung Wai-man, with 222 guests. At least one guest tested positive for COVID-19, causing all guests to be quarantined. Fok later refused to discuss how he could be held accountable for attending the party after the government had warned against gathering in large groups.

In January 2024, Fok said that funding from the Hong Kong Arts Development Council (HKADC) for an awards show had been cut to "reduce the risk of potentially breaching" the national security law.

In November 2025, during a Hong Kong Legislative Council election forum, Fok made a factual error when discussing "quality democracy". He claimed that the pre-1997 British Hong Kong government had long resisted allowing Hong Kong pursue the path of democracy. He stated that it was only in 1997 that Hong Kong Governor Sir MacLehose went to Beijing to meet Deng Xiaoping and learnt that Chinese had to determined to resume sovereignty over Hong Kong, then Britain suddenly accelerated constitutional reforms. However, Britain had previously attempted democratic reforms, including the 1946 Young Plan, the early 1980s District Board and representative government reforms, the introduction of first direct elections to legislative council in 1991 and the 1992 Patten constitutional reforms. The 1992 Patten's package was opposed by Beijing, leading to cancellation of "through train" arrangement. The meeting of MacLehose and Deng occurred in 1979, not 1997. Sir MacLehose served as governor from 1971 to 1982 and visited mainland China in 1979, but he had retired and returned to Britain well before 1997.

== Personal life ==
Fok met Guo Jingjing, China's "princess of diving" and multiple Olympic gold medallist, in 2004. The couple married on 8 November 2012 and have a son and two young daughters. In 2019, his father Timothy gifted a HK$160 million house in Repulse Bay to Kenneth and his family.

Legislative Council of Hong Kong
Preceded by Ma Fung-kwok	Member of Legislative Council; Representative for Sports, Performing Arts, Culture and Publication; 2022–present	Incumbent
