= Poman Lo =

Hong Kong businesswoman (born 1979)

- Born: 1979 (age 46–47)
- Education: Duke University
- Occupation: Business executive

Poman Lo (Chinese: 羅寶文; born 1979) is a Hong Kong business executive serving as the vice chairman of Century City International Holdings Limited and the vice chairman and managing director of Regal Hotels International Holdings Limited.

She is an adjunct professor at the Hong Kong University of Science and Technology and The University of Hong Kong.

Poman serves as a Council Member at HKUST, sits on the Green Technology and Finance Development Committee, and is a member of the Hong Kong Science and Technology Park Foundation.

She is also the founder of several sustainability and education non-profit initiatives, including the Institute of Sustainability and Technology (now operating as the One Earth Institute) and the One Earth Summit.

In 2015, Poman became the first female Asian recipient of the Oslo Business for Peace Award.

== Early life ==
Poman is the granddaughter of Hong Kong property tycoon Lo Ying-shek, who founded Great Eagle Holdings, and the daughter of Lo Yuk-sui, the chairman and CEO of Century City International Holdings and Regal Hotels Group.

In 1993, at the age of 14, Poman became the youngest recipient of the Hong Kong Outstanding Students Award. She was subsequently awarded the Angier B. Duke Scholarship at age 15, graduating summa cum laude with a Bachelor of Arts in psychology from Duke University at the age of 19.

She is the only recipient of the Hong Kong Outstanding Students Award to also be selected for the Outstanding Young Person of the World Award.

== Career ==
=== Regal Hotels and property ===
As Vice Chairman of Regal Hotels, Poman oversaw the launch of the group’s first online booking site in 2000, the establishment of Hong Kong’s first REIT in 2006, and the opening of its first carbon‑neutral hotel, iclub, in 2010.

=== Student-hotel brand ===
Poman is also the founder of ASPIRE HOUSE, a student‑hotel brand in Hong Kong that focuses on co‑living and community spaces for university students.

=== Wellness and technology initiatives ===
Poman established Regal Living, a wellness lifestyle brand that collaborates with the University of Hong Kong's School of Chinese Medicine, the Hong Kong Polytechnic University, and the Hong Kong University of Science and Technology to develop products that integrate traditional wellness principles with modern research and development.

== Sustainability and environmental advocacy ==
=== United Nations ESCAP ===
Poman is active in sustainable development initiatives within the United Nations Economic and Social Commission for Asia and the Pacific (UNESCAP). She serves as the co-chair of the ESBN Finance Task Force, a member of the ESBN executive committee, chair of the Asia Pacific Business Forum Organizing Committee, and chair of the Asia Pacific Green Deal for Business Committee.

=== Hong Kong government and advisory roles ===
Poman is an appointed member of the Chief Executive's Policy Unit Expert Group, the Green Technology and Finance Development Committee, and the Advisory Committee on Mental Health. She also serves as a foundation member of the Hong Kong Science and Technology Park and sits on the advisory board of the Hong Kong Academy for Wealth Legacy.

=== One Earth initiatives ===
To promote impact investing, Poman founded the non-profit Institute of Sustainability and Technology. In collaboration with global frameworks, she founded the annual One Earth Summit in Hong Kong, an event that has convened over 1,600 sustainability, government, and corporate leaders to coordinate cross-sector green finance policies.

Through the affiliated One Earth Alliance, she manages a public-private-philanthropic partnership framework designed to mobilize capital toward green technology firms across Asia. Poman also oversees the One Earth NextGen programs, which include tech-for-good collaborations such as the "Jumpstarter for One Earth" initiative with Alibaba, the "One Earth NextGen Innovators" program with the Temasek Foundation, and youth exchange initiatives designed to build cross-border university connections.

== Philanthropy and education ==
=== Bodhi Love Foundation ===
In 2013, Poman founded the Bodhi Love Foundation (BLF), which achieved Section 88 tax-exempt charitable status in Hong Kong in 2015. The foundation runs the SEED (Social, Emotional and Ethical Development) program, providing mindfulness-based training to parents, children, and educators. The program has trained over 200 teachers and reached more than 2,000 students across various pilot kindergartens in Hong Kong.

=== Values education and community boards ===
Poman is a member of the HKSAR Education Bureau's Curriculum Development Council Standing Committee on Values Education and the Advisory Committee on Mental Health. She serves as the honorary president of the Hong Kong Federation of Women.

== Media and creative works ==
=== Bodhi & Friends ===
Bodhi & Friends is a children's animation and media franchise focused on moral education and youth well-being. The property has secured international licensing agreements with companies including Mattel, Scholastic, and Minecraft. The brand has amassed over 350 million views on leading TV channels and 2 billion views on online media, and it is the only IP selected by the Ministry of Education (PRC) for values education in schools. More than 4 million bilingual books have been distributed across China.

=== Creative writing and public speaking ===
Poman has delivered public presentations on green finance and impact management at forums including the Milken Institute, the UN Global Compact Leaders Summit, and events hosted by the Financial Times.

She has also penned the lyrics for three hit songs: the English‑language Cantopop track “Love Paradise” (performed by Kelly Chen), the Mandarin theme song “Love and Shine” for Bodhi and Friends, and the Mandopop single “Dream of Bliss” (《幸福夢》, performed by Zhang Bichen).

== Awards and recognition ==
2014: Outstanding Young Person Award of the World

2015: Oslo Business for Peace Award (Business for Peace Foundation, Norway)

2023: Business Person of the Year Award (DHL/SCMP Hong Kong Business Awards)
