= Vincent Lo =

Hong Kong businessman

The Honourable Vincent Lo GBM GBS JP
- 羅康瑞
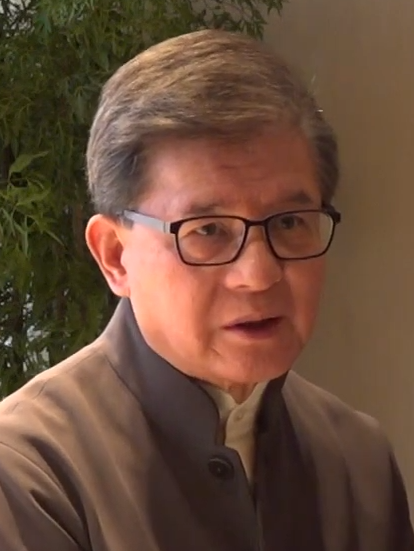
- Vincent Lo in 2021
- Born: Lo Hong-Sui; 18 April 1948 (age 78); Hong Kong
- Education: St. Joseph College; University of New South Wales
- Occupation: Chairman of Shui On Group
- Spouse(s): Jean Ho (1985－?); Loletta Chu (2008－)
- Children: 2
- Parent(s): Lo Ying-shek; To Lei-kwan

Vincent Lo
- Traditional Chinese: 羅康瑞
- Simplified Chinese: 罗康瑞
Transcriptions
Standard Mandarin
- Hanyu Pinyin: Luó Kāngruì
- Wade–Giles: Lo K'ang-jui
Yue: Cantonese
- Yale Romanization: Lòh Hōng seuih
- Jyutping: Lo^{4} Hong^{1} seui^{6}

Vincent Lo Hong-sui, GBM, GBS, JP (Chinese: 羅康瑞; born 18 April 1948) is a Hong Kong businessman. He is the chairman of Hong Kong–based Shui On Group, a building-materials and construction firm. He graduated from the University of New South Wales, Australia, in 1969. Upon returning to Hong Kong, started business with the sum of HK$100,000 (US$16,700) borrowed from his father, Hong Kong property tycoon Lo Ying-shek.

In 1984, Lo began investing in Shanghai and constructed a hotel in partnership with the Communist Youth League. The 1989 Tiananmen Square protests and massacre caused occupancy to plunge, and the league could not repay its construction loan. Lo assisted the league in dealing with the loan: Han Zheng was the Youth League secretary at the time, and is now mayor of Shanghai.

He was awarded the Grand Bauhinia Medal (GBM) by the Hong Kong SAR Government in 2017.

== Family ==
Vincent Lo married his ex-wife Jean Ho (何晶潔) in 1985, they had two children together.

Vincent Lo and his current wife Loletta Chu married on 27 November 2008.

Political offices
Preceded by Marvin Cheung	Chairman of the Hong Kong Airport Authority; 2014–2015	Succeeded by Jack So
Preceded by Jack So	Chairman of the Hong Kong Trade Development Council; 2015–2019	Succeeded by Peter Lam
Order of precedence
Preceded by Ip Kwok-him; Recipients of the Gold Bauhinia Star	Hong Kong order of precedence Recipients of the Gold Bauhinia Star	Succeeded by Henry Cheng; Recipients of the Gold Bauhinia Star
