= Shui On Land =

Chinese property development company

Shui On Land Limited 瑞安房地產有限公司
- Type: Public company
- Industry: real estate
- Founded: 2004
- Headquarters: Shanghai, People's Republic of China
- Key people: Chairman: Louis Lo
- Parent: Shui On Group
- Website: Shui On Land Limited

Shui On Land Limited
- Traditional Chinese: 瑞安房地產有限公司
- Simplified Chinese: 瑞安房地产有限公司
Transcriptions
Standard Mandarin
- Hanyu Pinyin: Ruì'ān Fángdìchǎn Yǒuxiàngōngsī
Yue: Cantonese
- Jyutping: seoi6 on1 fong4 dei6 caan2 jau5 haan6 gung1 si1

Shui On Land Limited (SEHK: 272) is the flagship property company of the Hong Kong–based Shui On Group. It is engaged in developing large-scale city-core development projects and integrated residential development projects in major cities in China, including Shanghai, Wuhan, Chongqing, Hangzhou, Dalian and Foshan. The company is headquartered in Shanghai and its chairman is Vincent Lo.

Shanghai's Xintiandi was developed by Shui On Land as "the first large-scale city-core redevelopment project by Shui On Land."

Shui On Land was listed on the Hong Kong Stock Exchange in 2006.

== See also ==
- Real estate in China
