= MTR Corporation =

Transport services company and property developer in Hong Kong

MTR Corporation Limited 香港鐵路有限公司

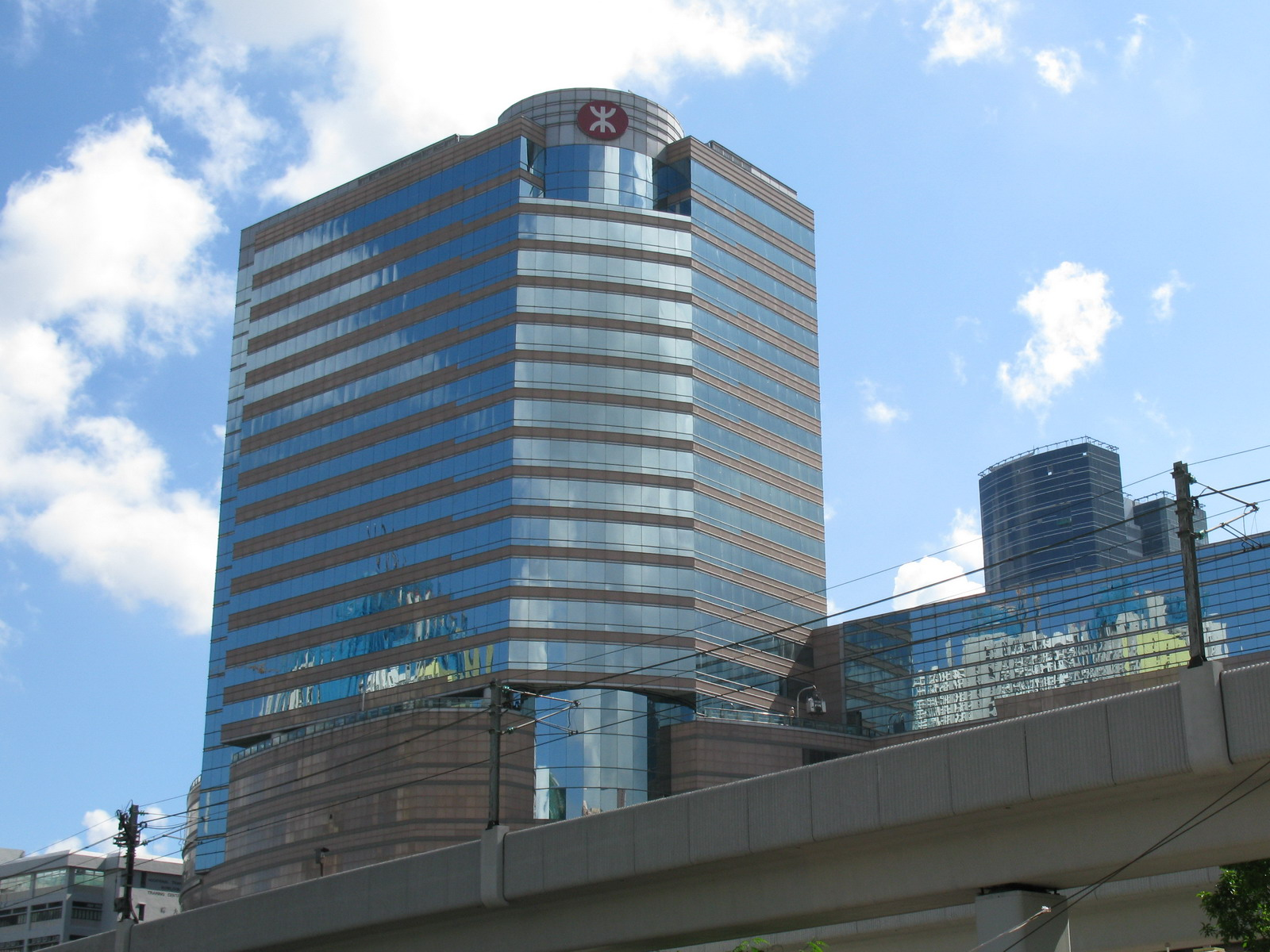
- Headquarters in Kowloon Bay, Hong Kong
- Formerly: Mass Transit Railway Corporation (1972–2000)
- Type: Public; Government-owned corporation
- Traded as: SEHK: 66; Hang Seng Index component
- Industry: Public transport; Real estate
- Founded: 22 September 1972; 54 years ago
- Headquarters: Kowloon Bay, Hong Kong
- Area served: Worldwide, including: Hong Kong; Australia; Melbourne, Victoria; Sydney, NSW; Mainland China: Shenzhen, Guangdong; Beijing; Hangzhou, Zhejiang
- Key people: Rex Auyeung (Chairperson); Jack So (CEO)
- Revenue: ▲HK$60.011 billion (2024)
- Operating income: ▲HK$22.260 billion (2024)
- Net income: ▲HK$15.772 billion (2024)
- Total assets: ▲HK$367.499 billion (2024)
- Total equity: ▲HK$185.625 billion (2024)
- Owner: Hong Kong Government (75.09%); Others (24.91%)
- Number of employees: More than 50,000 (2025)
- Website: www.mtr.com.hk

MTR Corporation
- Traditional Chinese: 香港鐵路有限公司
- Simplified Chinese: 香港铁路有限公司
- Literal meaning: Hong Kong Railway Corporation Limited
Transcriptions
Yue: Cantonese
- Yale Romanization: Hēung góng tit louh yáuh haahn gūng sī
- Jyutping: Hoeng1 gong2 tit3 lou6 jau5 haan6 gung1 si1

MTR Corporation Limited is a majority government-owned public transport operator and property developer in Hong Kong which operates the Mass Transit Railway, the most popular public transport network in Hong Kong. It is listed on the Hong Kong Exchange and is a component of the Hang Seng Index. The MTR additionally invests in railways across different parts of the world, including franchised contracts to operate rapid transit systems in Beijing, Hangzhou, Macao, Shenzhen, Sydney, and a suburban rail system in Melbourne.

== History ==
The Mass Transit Railway Corporation (Chinese: 地下鐵路公司) was established on 22 September 1972 as a government-owned statutory corporation to build and operate a mass transit railway system to meet Hong Kong's public transport needs. On 30 June 2000, the MTRC was succeeded by the MTR Corporation Limited (MTRCL, 地下鐵路有限公司). As with the MTRC, the MTRCL's principal business is to operate the mass transit railway system. Following a successful initial public offering (IPO), the MTRCL was listed on the Stock Exchange of Hong Kong (SEHK) on 5 October 2000, although the government is still the majority stakeholder in the MTRCL.

=== Partial privatisation ===
On 11 September 2000, the financial secretary of the Hong Kong Government, Sir Donald Tsang, announced the partial privatisation of MTR Corporation Limited. The offering was for one billion shares, but this was increased to 1.15 billion due to high demand. On 5 October 2000, the company was listed on the SEHK with 600,000 shareholders. In June 2001, MTR was added to the Hang Seng Index.

At the time of the IPO, the company was operating with a surplus of HK$360 million (US$46.1 million), which had increased from a surplus of HK$278 million (US$35.6 million) in 1997. The MTR has continued to be one of the few profitable public transport systems in the world. In 2024, according to internal business documents, MTR had a net profit of HK$15.8 billion (US$2 billion).

=== MTR–KCR merger ===
Railway network after merger

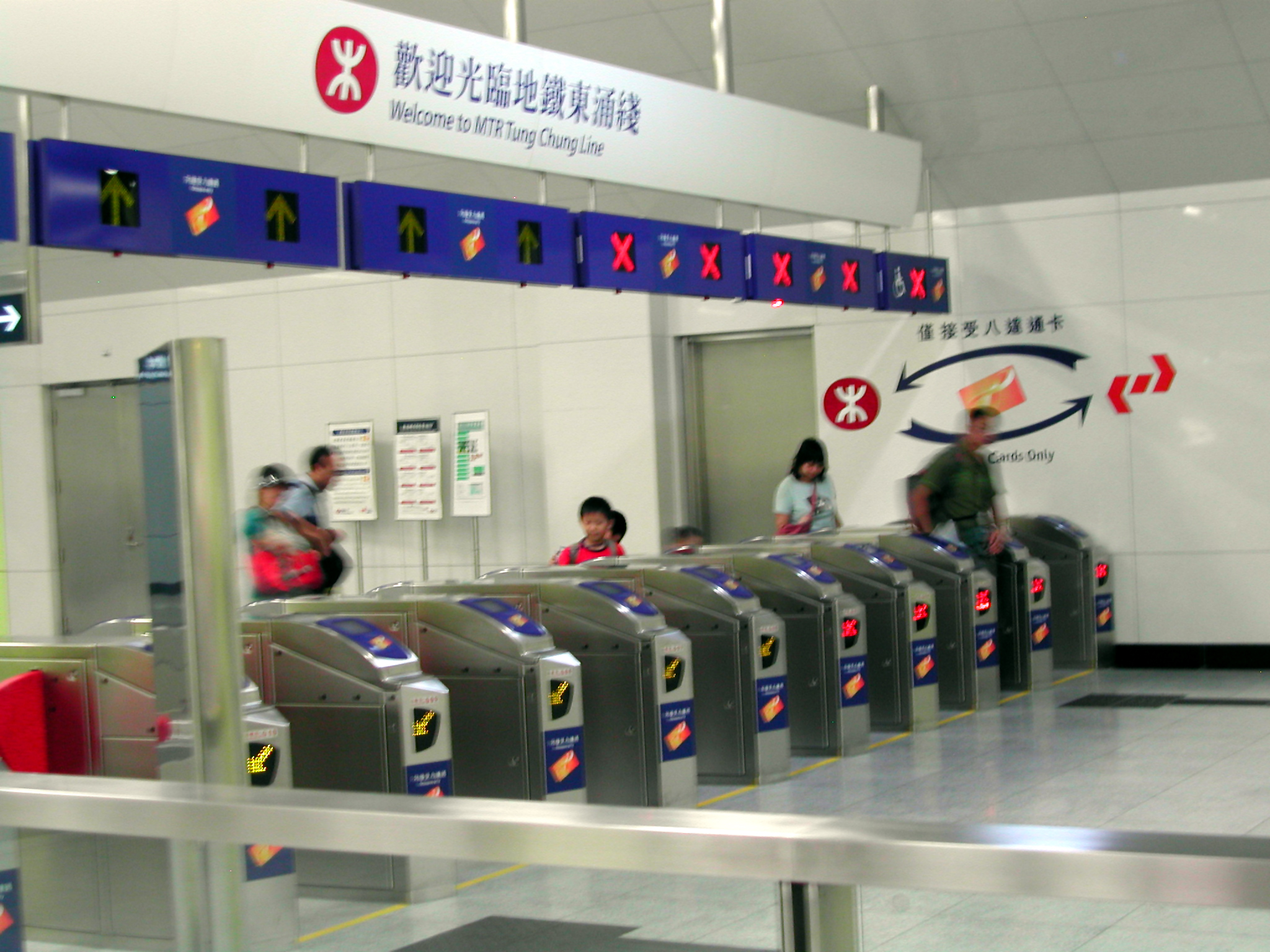
Ticket gates at key interchange stations were removed one year after 2007 merger

There had been some discussion of merging the Kowloon-Canton Railway Corporation (KCRC), which was also government-owned and the MTRCL to make the territory's transport system more efficient. The MTRCL backed such a merger while the KCRC opposed the plan. In March 2004, the Hong Kong Government officially encouraged the two companies to merge.

On 11 April 2006, the Hong Kong Government officially announced the details of the proposed merger. Under the non-binding memorandum of understanding the government has signed with KCRC, KCRC would grant a service concession to the MTRCL to operate the Kowloon–Canton Railway (KCR) system, with an initial period of 50 years. The KCRC would receive a one-time upfront payment of HK$4.25 billion, a fixed annual payment of HK$750 million and a variable annual payment based on revenues generated from operation of the KCR system. In addition, MTRCL would make a payment of $7.79 billion for the acquisition of property and other related commercial interests.

The KCRC's lines were less profitable than those of the MTRC, and the KCRC was less active in property development. It was widely considered that the government's choice was to avoid being criticised for selling assets of the KCRC, which it wholly owned, to MTRCL for an unreasonably low price. Leasing the operation rights of the KCR system to the MTRCL avoided actually selling the KCRC.

On 2 December 2007, the Chinese name of the MTRCL was changed to 香港鐵路有限公司 (lit. "Hong Kong Railway Corporation Limited") after being granted the Service Concession while the English name will remain unchanged. The KCRC is now a holding company of the KCR system, without actual railway operations. The merger was approved by shareholders of the MTRCL on 9 October 2007. The merger is effective for 50 years. This also resulted in changing the system's Chinese name from "地鐵" ("Subway") to "港鐵" ("Hong Kong Railway").

All adult Octopus Card holders would be the first to benefit from the merger. Student and concessionary Octopus holders would also benefit from the merger by further reducing $0.1 from their 50% off fares. Student Octopus holders would continue to pay the current reduced concessionary fares on the MTR network. Elderly Octopus holders would be introduced to a new fare system which only the elderly can enjoy a $2 fare to anywhere on the MTR network (excluding Airport Express, Light Rail, and Cross-Boundary Stations).

=== Revenue model ===
In July 2021, Liber Research Community, an NGO, produced a report which detailed the history of MTR's revenue model. In it, it reported that the "Rail + Property" development model was originally formed to offset unexpected financial difficulties with creating the original MTR lines, with original estimates that MTR's property would account for approximately 20 per cent of its total revenue.

The Executive Council also determined that since MTR had to apply for land grants from the government, it was the government's decision on how land above MTR stations should be allocated, stating "the grant of comprehensive development rights on land affected by railway installations will be discretionary". Land above stations would not necessarily be used to build private housing to maximize MTR's revenue, but could be used to solve issues of housing in Hong Kong, such as by developing public housing instead. The Executive Council also noted that "revenue from property development was not originally envisaged as being used as a means of financing the capital cost of the railway itself" and that revenue from property development was to be used for a "contingency reserve", such as for offsetting excessive construction costs.

The report noted that as of 2017, 40 per cent of MTR's revenue is from property and that the original intent of using property revenue for contingency purposes had shifted into a different, unsustainable model where property is used to subsidise operations and the construction of new stations.

=== Subordinated Perpetual Bond Issuance ===
MTR Corporation announced in June 2025 the successful pricing of its inaugural issuance of USD 3 billion subordinated perpetual securities, marking the largest-ever USD corporate subordinated perpetual bond issuance in Asia (excluding Japan). The issuance consists of two tranches: USD 1.5 billion perpetual securities with a 5.5-year non-call period and a coupon rate of 4.875%, and USD 1.5 billion perpetual securities with a 10.5-year non-call period and a coupon rate of 5.625%. Based on these terms, MTR will pay approximately USD 157.5 million (about HKD 1.24 billion) in annual interest.

== Senior leadership ==
- Chairman: Rex Auyeung (since July 2019)
- Chief Executive: Jacob Kam (since April 2019)

=== List of former chairmen ===
1. Sir Philip Haddon-Cave (1972–1974); project manager
2. Sir Norman Thompson (1974–1983); first official chairman
3. Sir Wilfrid Newton (1983–1989)
4. Hamish Mathers (1989–1995)
5. Jack So (1995–2003)
6. Raymond Ch'ien (2003–2015)
7. Frederick Ma (2016–2019)

=== List of former chief executives ===
The position of Chief Executive was created in 1995.

1. Jack So (1995–2003)
2. Sir Chow Chung-kong (2003–2011)
3. Jay Walder (2012–2014)
4. Lincoln Leong (2015–2019)

== Operations by market ==
=== Hong Kong ===
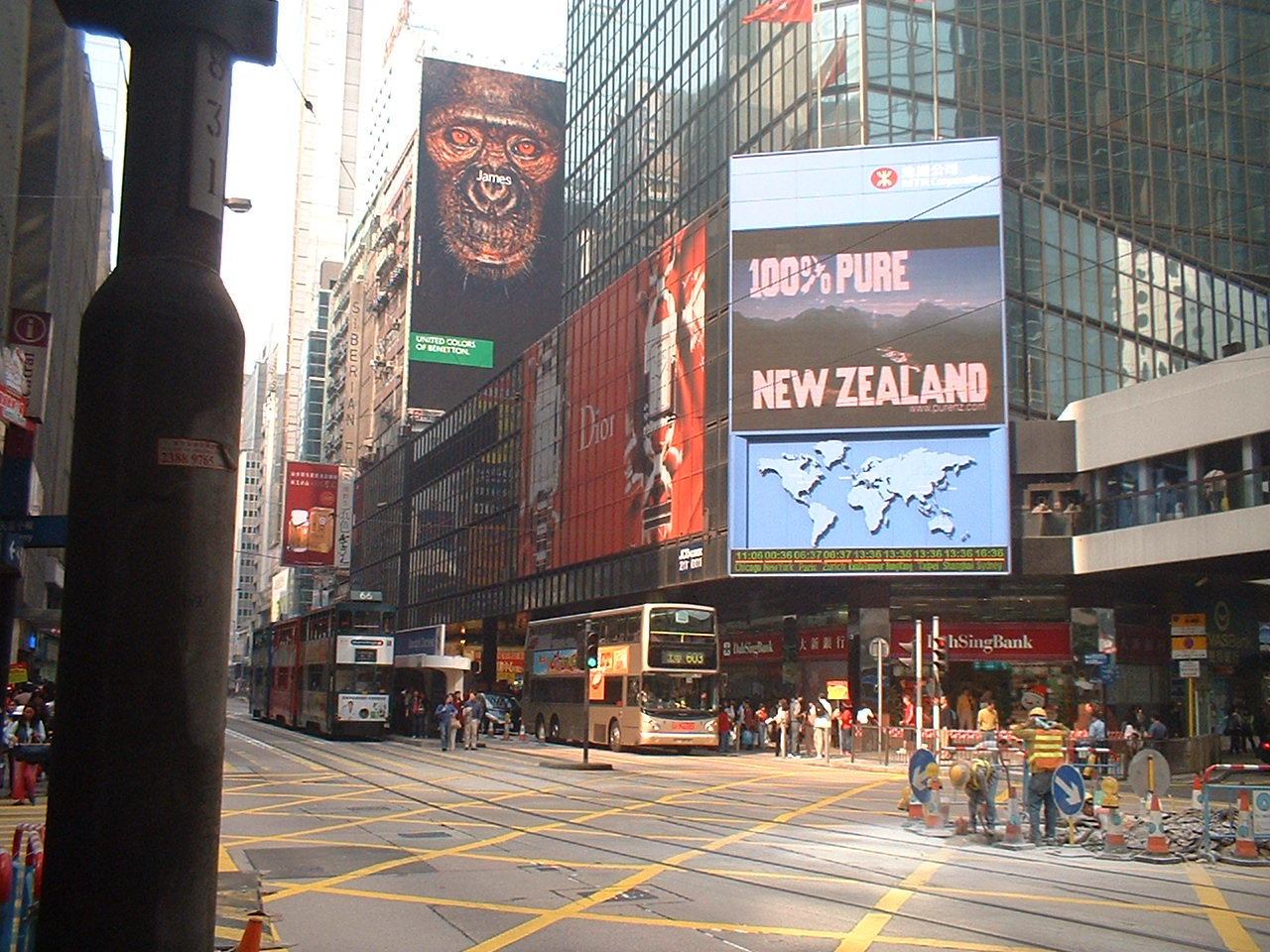
World Wide House, built by the MTR Corporation Limited.

On 5 October 2000 the operator of the MTR network, the Mass Transit Railway Corporation (MTRC), became Hong Kong's first rail company to be partially privatised, marking the beginning of the Hong Kong government's initiative to reduce its interests in public utilities. Prior to its listing on the Hong Kong Stock Exchange, the Mass Transit Railway Corporation (MTRC) was wholly owned by the Hong Kong government. MTR Corporation is responsible for the operation of MTR (and the Kowloon–Canton Railway since 2 December 2007). The rail lines are profitable, but the MTR Corporation derives most of its profits from property development (usually adjacent to railway stations) and other commercial activities in Hong Kong, including the letting of retail and poster advertising space, ATM banking facilities, and personal telecommunication services.

==== Rail services ====
Mass Transit Railway (MTR) is the rapid transit railway system in Hong Kong. Originally opened in 1979, the system currently (at September 2024) includes 271 km (168 mi) of rail with 167 stations, including 99 railway stations and 68 light rail stops. There are also several future projects.

Map

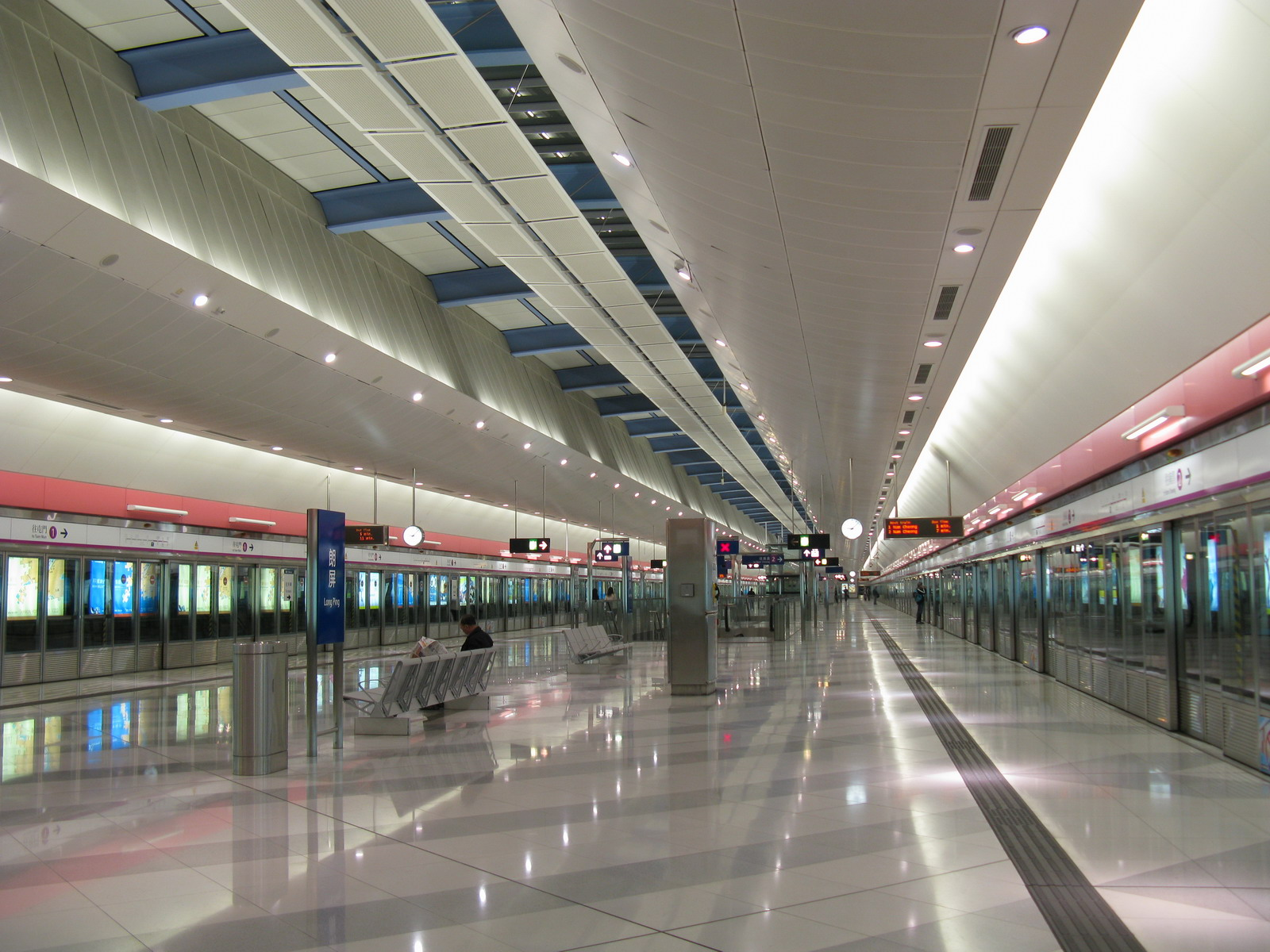
Station (Long Ping station)

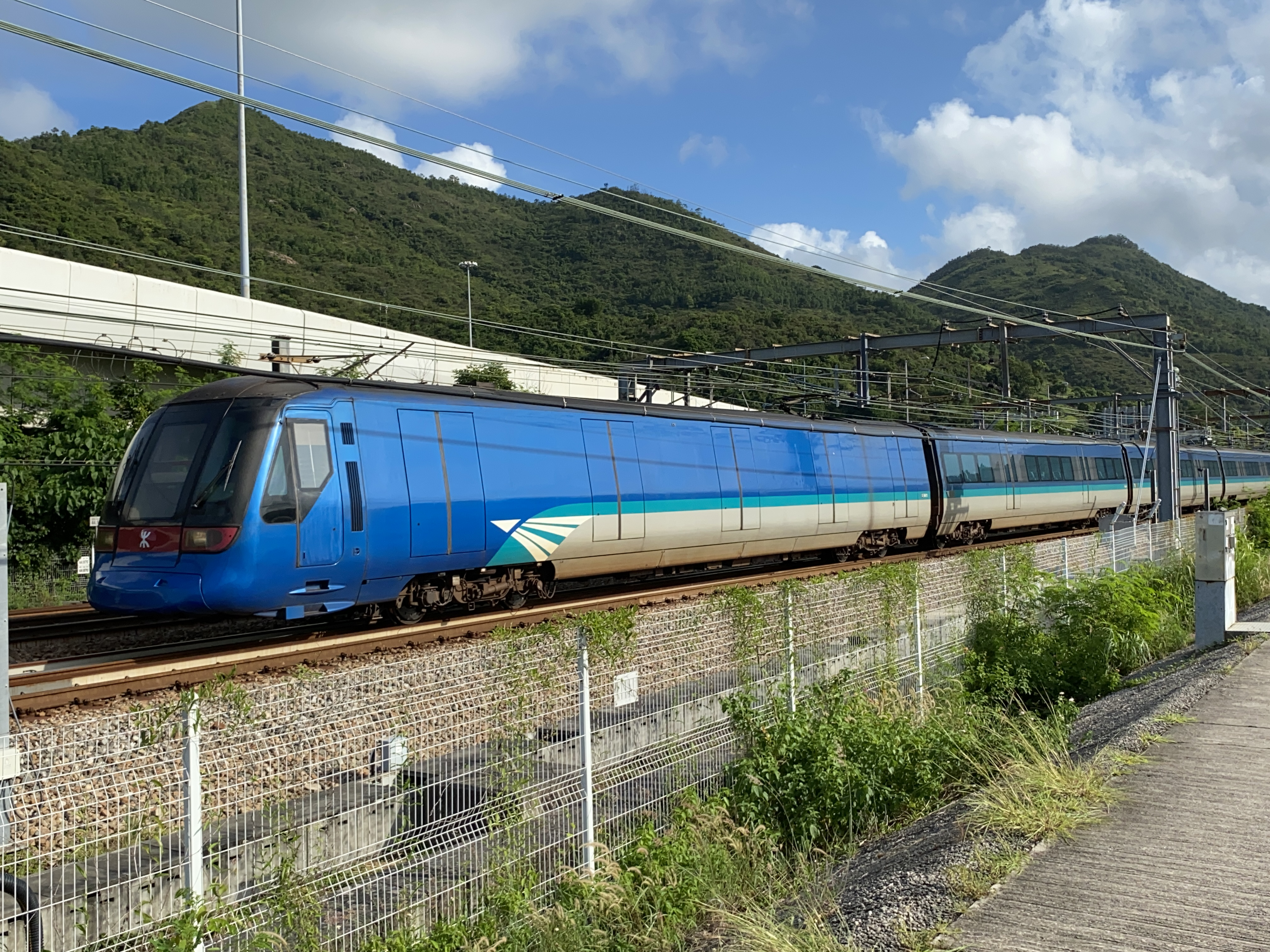
An Airport Express Train

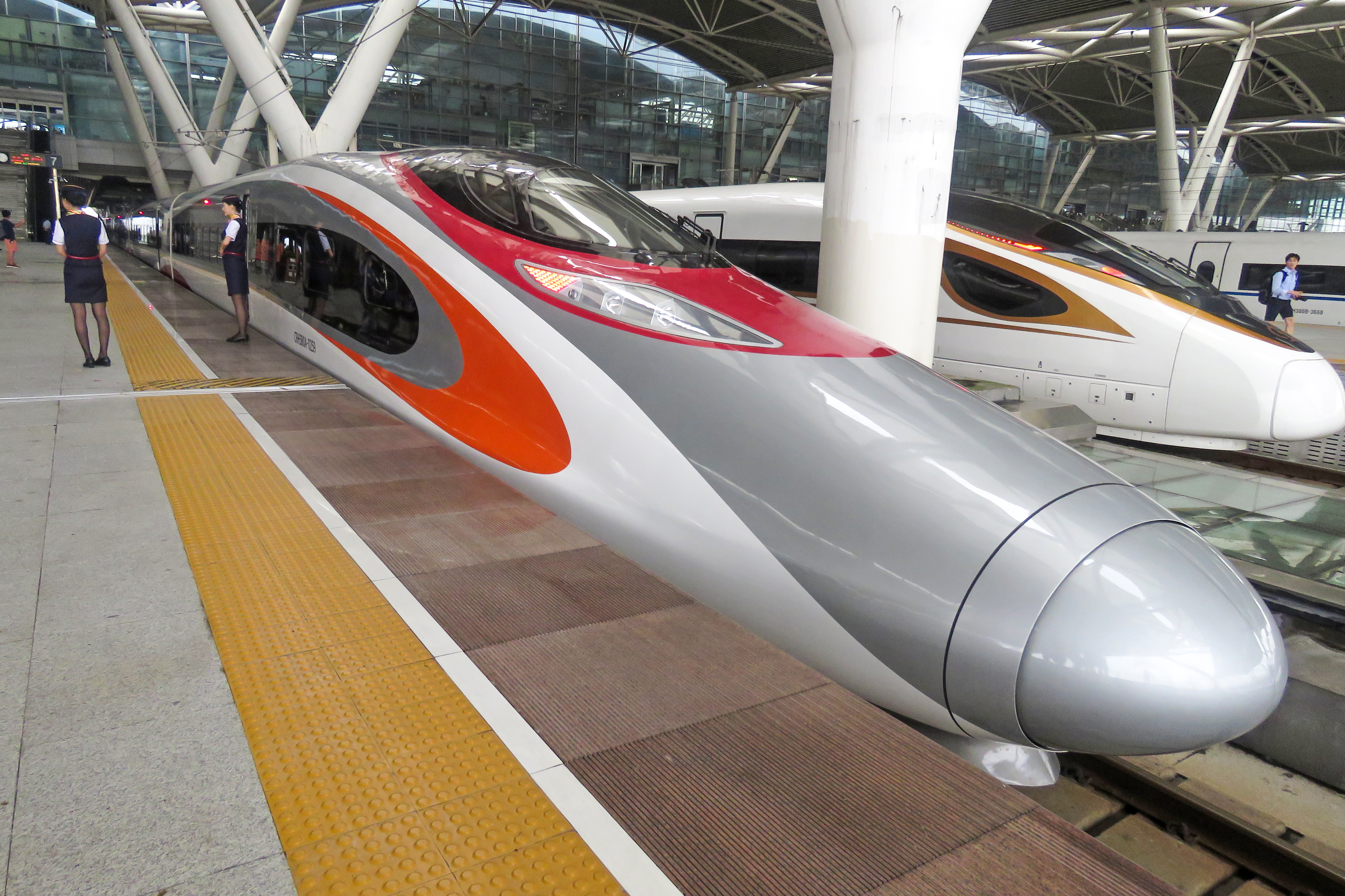
High-speed rail service by MTR launched on 23 September 2018. The image shows an MTR Vibrant Express train at Guangzhou South railway station

==== Property management ====
Property is one of the main businesses of the MTR, generating most of its profits. In 2009, with a net profit of HK$7.3 billion, MTR made HK$3.55 billion from property and HK$2.12 billion from transport operations. The MTR tries to develop suitable sites related to their new railway projects and their existing railway. For instance, the reclaimed land situated in West Kowloon owned by the MTR was developed into Union Square, a mixed-use development with residential, office, retail, and hotel space. The site includes the tallest commercial building in Hong Kong, the 118-storey International Commerce Centre.

Central's landmark International Finance Centre is managed by Premier Plus, MTR's elite property management brand.

===== Shopping centres =====
The MTR Corporation invested heavily to develop large shopping centres around MTR stations. The most recent example is the PopCorn mall located at Tseung Kwan O station. It is connected to the adjacent malls, high-end housing and hotels. Another example of such a shopping centre is Maritime Square located at Tsing Yi station. Maritime Square is a nautical-themed mall in which there are supermarkets, boutiques, bookstores, a cinema, and restaurants. Since Tsing Yi station serves as the transport hub for Tsing Yi, Maritime Square is also easily accessible by other transport means including buses and taxis. Other shopping centres developed and managed by the corporation include CityLink, Elements, Hanford Plaza, Ocean Walk, Paradise Mall, Plaza Ascot, Sun Tuen Mun Shopping Centre, Telford Plaza, The Lane, the LOHAS, and Luk Yeung Galleria.

As of 2023, MTR Corporation owns a total of 13 shopping malls across Hong Kong, classified into luxury, regional, and neighbourhood malls.

=== Sweden ===
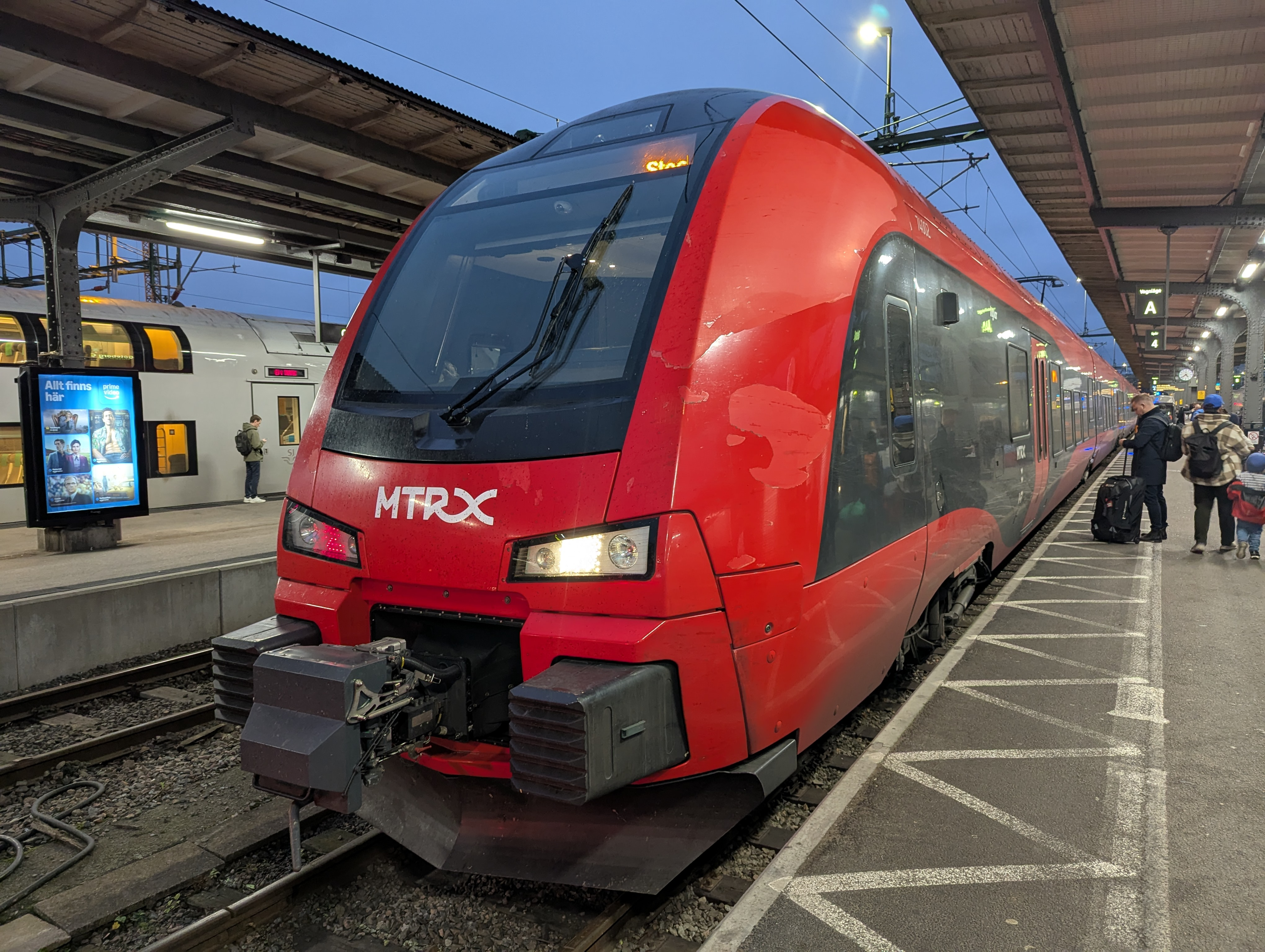
MTRX train in Gothenburg, Sweden

MTR Nordic AB is a subsidiary of MTR Corporation UK based in Stockholm that operated in the public transportation sector through various subsidiaries. The CEO of MTR Nordic is Henrik Dahlin.

==== Former operations ====
- MTR Tunnelbanan AB (known as MTR Stockholm AB until June 2016) was responsible for the operation, planning and maintenance of the Stockholm Metro. In January 2009, Tunnelbanan Teknik Stockholm, a 50/50 joint venture between MTR and Mantena, was awarded the contract from Storstockholms Lokaltrafik (SL) to operate the network for eight years with an option to extend for another six years. MTR started operating the metro on 2 November 2009, and in September 2015 the six-year extension was granted. The contract with SL for the metro extended to November 2025. In January 2016, MTR bought out its joint venture partner. The division has approximately 3,000 employees with Caroline Åstrand as its CEO. Metro operations was taken over in November 2025 by Connecting Stockholm AB.
- MTR Tech AB, formerly Tunnelbanan Teknik Stockholm AB (TBT), carried out maintenance of the Stockholm Metro rolling stock.
- MTR Express (Sweden) AB (2015–2024) operated long-distance trains between Stockholm and Gothenburg as a private open access operator using the brand name MTRX. The service, operational since 21 March 2015, uses six X74 (Stadler Flirt) electric multiple units travelling at up to 200 km/h. The division had 90 employees based in both Stockholm and Gothenburg, led by CEO Joakim Sundh. Sold May 2024 to VR Group
- MTR Pendeltågen AB (2016–2024) was the operator of the Stockholm commuter rail network between 11 December 2016 and 3 March 2024. MTR took overall responsibility for the network, trains, and stations in a contract for 10 years, with an option to extend for another four years. In November 2023, citing poor performance by MTR, SL decided to cut short the existing contract, and awarded an emergency contract to SJ, which took over the operation from March 2024. In November 2023 it was reported that MTR would pay a total fine of 800 million kronor (US$76.8 million) to SL. This sum included 300 million SEK (US$28.8 million) for penalties and contract breaches, and 280 million SEK (US$26.9 million) to cover SL's extra expenses due to MTR's early termination.
- MTR Mälartåg AB (2021–2024) was awarded the contract to run regional Mälartåg trains between 2021 and 2029. In July 2022, MTR Mälartåg was required to pay multi-million kronor penalties to Mälardalstrafik due to over 6,100 fully or partially cancelled train departures during the first half of the year. After facing continuing challenges, MTR decided in 2024 to terminate its Mälartåg contract five years early. Mälartåg operations were taken over in June 2024 by Transdev.

=== Australia ===
- Melbourne: In June 2009, the Metro Trains Melbourne consortium of MTR (60%), John Holland and United Rail (20% each) were selected to operate the Melbourne suburban railway network, taking over from Connex Melbourne on 30 November 2009. In September 2016, the government opened negotiations with Metro Trains Melbourne to extend the contract for seven years until November 2024.
- Sydney: In June 2014, Northwest Rapid Transit, a consortium consisting of MTR (60%), John Holland Group, Leighton Contractors, Plenary Group and UGL Rail, was selected to deliver the Sydney Metro Northwest operations contract. As part of the consortium, MTR Corporation, John Holland and UGL Rail formed the Metro Trains Sydney joint venture to operate services on the line for 15 years. The North West Rail Link opened in May 2019, and was extended through the CBD in August 2024, and then to Bankstown in October 2026.

=== Mainland China ===
MTR operates nine lines in three cities in mainland China, and continued to progress station commercial business in Chengdu, Zhengzhou and Xi’an.

Logo	Name	Founded	Website
	Beijing MTR Corporation Limited	16 January 2006	mtr.bj.cn
	Hangzhou MTR Corporation Limited	6 September 2012	mtrhz.com.cn
	MTR Corporation (Shenzhen) Limited	March 2004 (from Shenzhen Metro Group)	mtrsz.com.cn

==== Beijing ====
The company has also formed a joint-venture Beijing MTR Corporation Limited (Jinggang MTR) (49%) with Beijing Capital Group ("BCG") (49%) and the Beijing Infrastructure Investment Co ("BIIC") (2%) to build and operate for 30 years Line 4, Daxing line, Line 14, Line 16 and Line 17 of the Beijing Subway.

==== Hangzhou ====
The company formed a new joint-venture Hangzhou MTR (Hanggang MTR) with Hangzhou Metro Group in 2012 to operate Line 1 of the Hangzhou Metro for 28 years, in which MTR holds 49% of the stock, while Hangzhou Metro Group holds the other 51% of the stock. Line 5 of the Hangzhou Metro is operated by Hangzhou MTR Line 5 Ltd., which MTR holds 60% of the stock.

==== Shenzhen ====
The company concluded initials concession agreement to build phase 2 of the Line 4 of the Shenzhen Metro, and to operate the whole line on a BOT basis for 30 years from 1 July 2010. The phase 2 of Line 4 have been in operation for passengers since 16 June 2011. Line 13, which began operation on 28 December 2024, is also operated by MTR Corporation (Shenzhen).

=== Former operations ===
==== United Kingdom ====
MTR Elizabeth line logo

- Elizabeth line: In May 2015, TfL Rail began an eight-year contract to operate the Crossrail concession in London, with an option for a further two years. Before the new railway lines opened, MTR already operated Liverpool Street–Shenfield and Paddington–Heathrow Airport services branded as TfL Rail. In May 2022 services commenced between Paddington and Abbey Wood via Liverpool Street, and all services were renamed Elizabeth line. In November 2024, Transport for London announced that MTR had lost its bid to renew the operation of the Elizabeth line to GTS Rail Operations. Subsequently, GTS Rail Operations took over Elizabeth line operations from 25 May 2025 onwards.
- London Overground: MTR and Laing Rail established a 50/50 joint venture (MTR Laing) to bid for the London Overground concession. MTR Laing won the bid and trading as London Overground Rail Operations operated the concession from November 2007. After Laing Rail and Arriva UK Trains were brought under the ownership of Deutsche Bahn in 2007 and 2010 respectively, Arriva took over the Laing Rail's share of the concession. In June 2015, MTR was shortlisted to bid for the next London Overground concession in its own right, but lost out to its previous partner, Arriva. Arriva Rail London took over full operation in November 2016.
- South Western Railway: In August 2017, South Western Railway, in which MTR has a 30% shareholding in a joint venture with FirstGroup, began operating the South Western franchise. In December 2024, it was announced that the franchise was to be renationalised in May 2025.

===== Unsuccessful or withdrawn bids =====
- In 2004, MTR in a joint venture with Sea Containers unsuccessfully bid for the Integrated Kent franchise.
- In 2007, MTR was shortlisted to bid for the West Midlands franchise, but did not lodge a bid.
- In February 2009, MTR Corporation were shortlisted to operate the Tyne & Wear Metro concession in Newcastle upon Tyne.
- In November 2013, MTR was announced as a bidder for the ScotRail franchise.
- In April 2016, MTR was again shortlisted to bid for the West Midlands franchise, however again withdrew.
- In October 2016, MTR was shortlisted to operate the Wales & Borders franchise.
- In June 2017 a joint venture between MTR and Guangshen Railway Company was shortlisted to bid for the West Coast Partnership franchise to commence in 2019. In December 2018 Spanish operator Renfe Operadora joined their bid, with Snowfall as a software subcontractor. In August 2019, it was announced that MTR was unsuccessful in the bid, losing to a joint bid by First and Trenitalia.
- In November 2024, MTR lost its bid to renew the operating contract of the Elizabeth line, losing to a joint bid by Go-Ahead Group, Tokyo Metro and Sumitomo Corporation.

==== Macau ====
MTR Railway Operations (Macau) Company Limited 港鐵軌道營運（澳門）有限公司
- Type: Public company
- Industry: Transport
- Founded: 11 April 2018
- Defunct: 31 December 2024; 22 months ago
- Headquarters: Taipa, Macau
- Area served: Macau
- Website: MTR (Macau, archived)

MTR Railway Operations (Macau) Company Limited was a wholly owned subsidiary of MTR Corporation that operated the Taipa line of the Macau Light Rapid Transit (MLRT or MLM) in Macau since the line's opening on 10 December 2019 until 2024. MTR was contracted to operate and maintain the line for 80 months. However in 2024, MTR has gradually handed over the operations to Sociedade do Metro Ligeiro de Macau, S.A., an operator owned by the government of Macau Special Administrative Region.
