= Bodhi and Friends =

Hong Kong animated television series

Bodhi and Friends is an animated television series produced in Hong Kong. It serves as flagship property of Century Innovative Technology Limited, a children's multimedia company founded by Poman Lo. CIT has launched the award-winning 3D animation TV series, Bodhi and Friends: Space Squad, from February 2014, which is widely broadcast throughout China and Hong Kong. Additionally, CIT has introduced BodhiWorld, a child-friendly platform.

== About Bodhi and Friends ==
Bodhi and Friends was created in 2006 as a charity project. In 2012, with the establishment of CIT, Bodhi and Friends was launched as a commercial brand. In 2014, the first season of Bodhi and Friends animation aired on CCTV Children Channel prime time, along with more than 100 regional channels, attracting over 226 million views. The first season of Bodhi and Friends accumulated more than 100 million views on online video platforms. In 2015, the second season of Bodhi and Friends gained #1 spot on both CCTV Children Channel and Hunan Television, the two most popular children TV channels in China. It is licensed by the world's largest children publishing company Scholastic to develop books.

It collaborates with education technology company Skoolbo to co-develop interactive literacy programs. In 2016, Bodhi and Friends animation IP was licensed to Mattel for the development and distribution of toys around the world. This is the first time Mattel has licensed a Chinese animation IP in its 70 year history. In 2017, two new animation seasons (Bodhi and Friends -Dream Alliance and Bodhi and Friends -Dream Hero) aired on TV and online platforms. In the summer of 2017, Season 4 (Bodhi and Friends -Dream Hero) was the most viewed children's animation among online Chinese platforms, ranking 3rd place for the first time.

== Characters ==
- Bodhi – The group's charismatic leader with a courageous heart. Legend has it, he was born amongst the stars.

Bodhi and Friends

- Darling – Loving and generous, Darling is as sweet as the ice cream she constantly has in her hand. She is also an avid cook.
- Freddy – A huggable, playful friend whose mischievousness always finds a way to put one over on the bad guys.
- Honey – The diva of the group, Honey has an eye for beauty and a knack for charming her way out of any situation.
- Elvis – Although some might see him as quiet, Elvis's friends admire him for his passion and artistic flair.
- Goody – A zen, kung fu master and Bodhi's most dependable friend.
- Chloe – The cheerleader of the group, Chloe always manages to put a smile on her friends’ faces.
- Aimee – A child prodigy, Aimee's wit and sharpness never fail to impress. Bodhi often comes to her for help in important moments.
- Bobot – An extraterrestrial robot from outer space who was discovered on one of Bodhi and Friend's adventures. Now one of the gang, he is like a sidekick to Bodhi.

== TV animation ==
Bodhi and Friends: Space Squad is a 3D TV animation season. The first season of 52-episodes premiered on CCTV (China) prime time during the Lunar New Year holiday in 2014, followed by 70 local channels and online portals in China, as well as Now TV (Hong Kong). The second season of 52-episodes will air in 2015. The third season is currently in production. Bodhi and Friends: Space Squad was awarded:

- Gold Award in Shenzhen Animation Festival (2014)
- Gold Lotus Award for Best TV Animation at Macau International Film Festival (2014)
- Golden Dragon Award (China)
- Golden Lotus Award for Most Popular 3D Animation (2014)

Online video platforms have attracted over 60 million views and more than 4.6 million Weibo followers. The opening and closing songs are sung by Hong Kong singer Kelly Chen.
