= Elliot G. Sander =

American businessman

Executive Director & Chief Executive Officer of the Metropolitan Transportation Authority
- In office January 1, 2007 – May 22, 2009
- Governor: David Paterson; Eliot Spitzer
- Preceded by: Katherine Lapp
- Succeeded by: Helena E. Williams (as Interim Executive Director); Jay Walder (as CEO)

Elliot "Lee" Sander is a transport executive who was CEO of the Metropolitan Transportation Authority for over two years from 2007 to 2009.

== Career ==
In January 2007, Sander was appointed by New York Governor Eliot Spitzer as executive director and CEO of the Metropolitan Transportation Authority (MTA), which operates New York's subway, bus, and bridge and tunnel network. The MTA also operates the commuter rail system for both New York and Connecticut. His administration faced two service interruptions in July and August 2007 caused by torrential rains, including the storm associated with the 2007 Brooklyn tornado. His subsequent work to improve the MTA's emergency preparedness and on climate change has been credited with creating the framework for the MTA's highly successful recovery from Hurricane Sandy, which devastated other transit properties. He also implemented two rounds of fare and toll increases in 2008 and 2009, due to the MTA's weakened finances.

Sander tendered his resignation to Governor David Paterson on Thursday, May 7, 2009, saying he was resigning to give Paterson the chance to take the authority in "a different direction". Sander served as Commissioner of the New York City Department of Transportation under Mayor Rudolph Giuliani from 1994 to 1996, where he was credited with improving the agency's performance, including eliminating graffiti and debris from the city's highways and bridges, and completing the reconstruction of Columbus Avenue in record time, while reducing the agency's budget by 20%. After leaving full-time public service, Mayor Giuliani and then Mayor Michael Bloomberg appointed Sander to serve as a Commissioner on the New York City Taxi and Limousine Commission (1997 to 2006).

Sander was president and chief executive officer of the HAKS Group, an architectural and engineering firm specializing in water, wastewater, transportation, and buildings, from November 2011 until January 2015. Prior to that, Sander served as Group Chief Executive, Global Transportation for Aecom, from August 2009 to November 2011. He also was Senior Vice President for Aecom from June 1996 to December 2006.

Previously, he was managing director, Global Transportation and US Infrastructure at Hatch Ltd. He is also the Senior Independent Director of the board of Mobico Group. Sander is Chairman Emeritus of the Regional Plan Association, Vice-chairman of the Greater Jamaica Development Corporation, and on the Board of the Leo Baeck Institute. Sander is the founder of the Rudin Center for Transportation Policy and Management and Management at the Robert F. Wagner Graduate School of Public Service at New York University. He also co-founded the Empire State Transportation Alliance (ESTA). From 2018 until 2021 he was president of Bombardier Transportation's American operations. He departed after Bombardier was taken over by Alstom.

Preceded by Katherine Lapp	Executive Director of the Metropolitan Transportation Authority; 2007 – 2009	Succeeded by H. Dale Hemmerdinger
