= Timothy Fok =

Member of the Chinese People's Political Consultative Conference

The Honourable Timothy Fok Tsun-ting GBM GBS JP
- 霍震霆
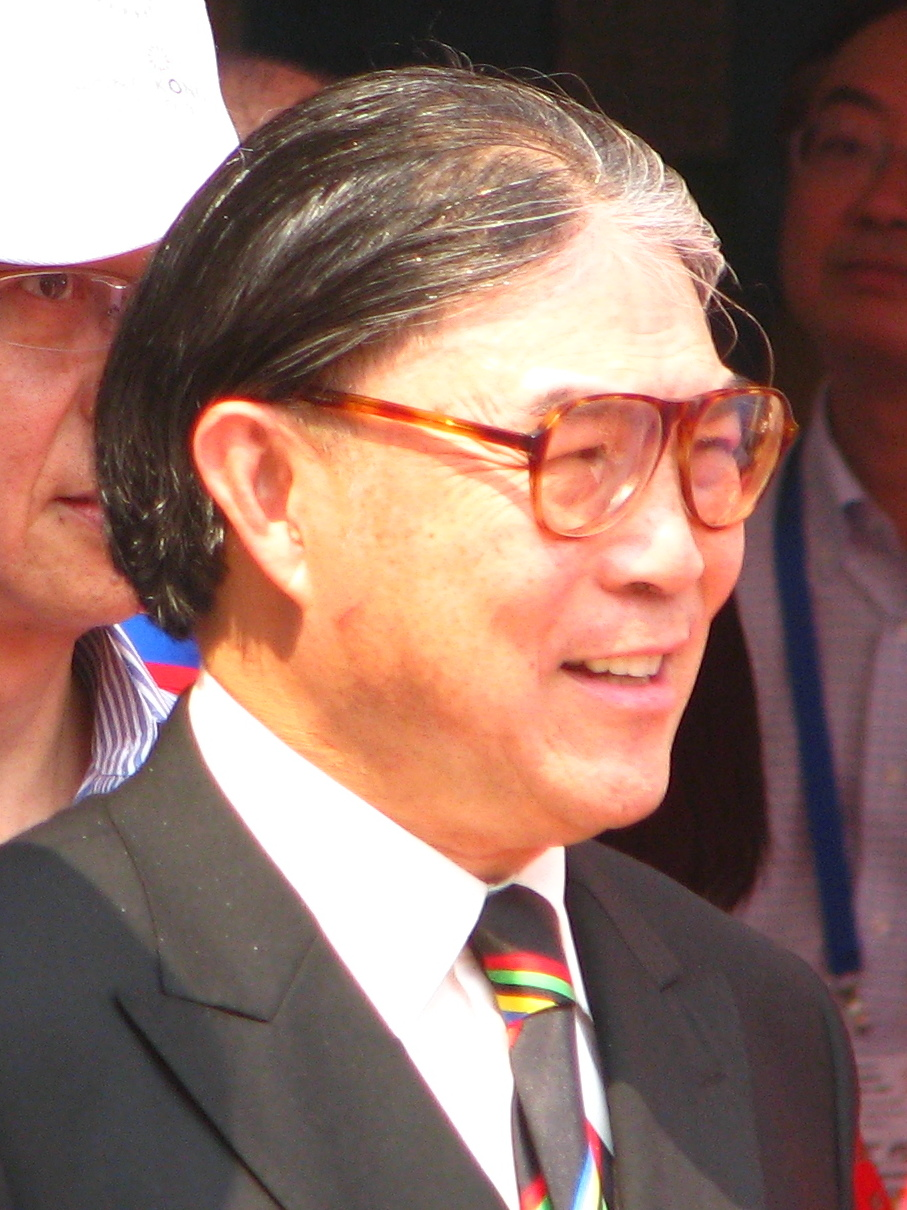

Member of the Legislative Council of Hong Kong
- In office 1 July 1998 – 30 September 2012
- Preceded by: New parliament
- Succeeded by: Ma Fung-kwok
- Constituency: Sports, Performing Arts, Culture and Publication
- In office 21 December 1996 – 30 June 1998 (Provisional Legislative Council)

Personal details
- Born: 14 February 1946 (age 80) British Hong Kong
- Spouse: Loletta Chu (m. 1978–2004)
- Children: Kenneth Fok Kai-kong; Eric Fok Kai-shan; Jeremy Fok Kai-yan
- Parent(s): Henry Fok; Lui Yin-nei
- Education: University of Southern California

Timothy Fok
- Chinese: 霍震霆
Transcriptions
Standard Mandarin
- Hanyu Pinyin: Huò Zhèntíng
- Wade–Giles: Huo Chen-t'ing
- Yale Romanization: Hwò Jěn Tíng
Yue: Cantonese
- Yale Romanization: Fok Jan-tìhng
- Jyutping: Fok3 Zan3-ting4
- IPA: [fɔ̄ːk tɕɐ̄ntʰȉŋ]

Timothy Fok Tsun-ting (born 14 February 1946), GBM, GBS, JP, the eldest son of Hong Kong tycoon Henry Fok, is the President of the Hong Kong Football Association. He formerly represented the Sports, Performing Arts, Culture and Publication functional constituency between 1998 and 2012. While he was not affiliated with any political party, he caucused with the conservative wing of Legislative Council of Hong Kong.

He is a former Member of the National Committee of the Chinese People's Political Consultative Conference.

He is an Honorary Doctor of Laws of the Renmin University of China.

== Biography ==
=== Education ===
Fok was educated at St. Stephen's College, Stanley Hong Kong, Millfield School, a boarding school in Somerset, England, and the University of Southern California, United States.

=== Affiliations and politics ===
Fok was an active member of the International Olympic Committee from 2001 to 2016 and an honorary member since 2017; President of the Sports Federation and Olympic Committee of Hong Kong; Vice-President of the Olympic Council of Asia (OCA); a Member of the 2008 Olympics Coordination Commission; President of the Hong Kong Sports Writer Association; Vice President of the Organising Committee of the 2008 Olympics and Paralympics Equestrian Events (which he is credited with bringing to Hong Kong); Vice President of the Hong Kong East Asian Games Organising Committee; and President of the Hong Kong Football Association.

Fok represents the Sports, Performing Arts, Culture and Publication functional constituency in the Legislative Council of Hong Kong. He is not affiliated with any political party, and is also a Member of the Chinese People's Political Consultative Conference.

==== Sports Federation and Olympic Committee ====
With Fok as president of the SF&OC, there have numerous allegations of misconduct against the SF&OC and Fok. In August 2016, the Hong Kong Economic Journal released an article, accusing the SF&OC and Timothy Fok of various transgressions. In April 2020, the government's Audit Commission released a 141-page report after investigating the Olympic Committee, describing various failures with the SF&OC, including lax governance. A month later, in May 2020, Legislative Council members questioned the Olympic Committee's governance, accusing the SF&OC of lacking transparency when selecting athletes for the 2018 Asian Games. Professor Chung Pak-kwong, former chief executive of the Hong Kong Sports Institute, said that the SF&OC "has grown into an empire and transparency and accountability are not in their dictionary."

==== Hong Kong Football Association ====
Timothy Fok has served as president of the Hong Kong Football Association since 1997, after his father held the position for almost 30 years. In July 2020, the Legislative Council's Public Accounts Committee criticized the HKFA under Timothy Fok, stating its governance was "appalling and inexcusable". It noted that an internal audit committee, designed to review the association's use of taxpayer funding, was not active between 2015 and 2019, despite receiving HK$34 million in funding for the 2017–18 year. Members of the Legislative Council also questioned if that taxpayer money was justified and well spent.

In 2015, Timothy Fok publicly supported former FIFA chief Sepp Blatter, who was probed for corruption and bribery; soccer fans protested against Fok outside of the HKFA office, in addition to writing the HKFA a letter of concern, stating Fok's support of Blatter was contrary to anti-corruption practices.

==== Legislative Council ====
In 2008, SCMP reported that Fok had the worst attendance record at LegCo meetings, for the third straight year. Additionally, he attended less than 30% of 3 separate bills committees he joined. In response, Fok said "I am going to review this." However, two years later in 2010, SCMP reported that Fok's attendance was still last for the 6th consecutive year, and that his participation on some panels had gotten worse. Fok had earlier claimed that attendance records were "too simple a tool to judge a lawmaker's performance."

In 2010 Catholic Monitors rated three legislators, one of which was Fok, as less than satisfactory for failing to raise motions or amendments throughout the entire Legco year.

=== Family ===
He was married to former Miss Hong Kong Loletta Chu. The couple, who have three sons, announced their divorce in September 2006, more than five years after their marriage was reported to be 'crumbling'.

His elder son, Kenneth, married Guo Jingjing on 8 November 2012, who is a retired Chinese female diver, and multi-time Olympic gold medalist and world champion. In 2019, Timothy gifted a HK$160 million house in Repulse Bay to Kenneth and his family.

His other son, Eric, also has attracted media attention due to his relationship with Chinese actress Zhang Ziyi.

In 2010, his youngest son, Jeremy Fok, was convicted for dangerous driving and drunk driving; he was tested by police at more than 4 times the legal limit. Jeremy Fok's lawyer stated that Jeremy suffered from depression, and that he suffered stress from having to study math. Additionally, the lawyer stated that Jeremy Fok was not spoiled because he did charity work in Sri Lanka.

Legislative Council of Hong Kong
New parliament	Member of Provisional Legislative Council; 1997–1998	Replaced by Legislative Council
New parliament	Member of Legislative Council; Representative for Sports, Performing Arts, Culture and Publication; 1998–2012	Succeeded by Ma Fung-kwok
Order of precedence
Preceded by James E. Thompson; Recipients of the Gold Bauhinia Star	Hong Kong order of precedence Recipients of the Gold Bauhinia Star	Succeeded by Miriam Lau; Recipients of the Gold Bauhinia Star
