= Loletta Chu =

Chinese actress and beauty pageant titleholder

- 朱玲玲
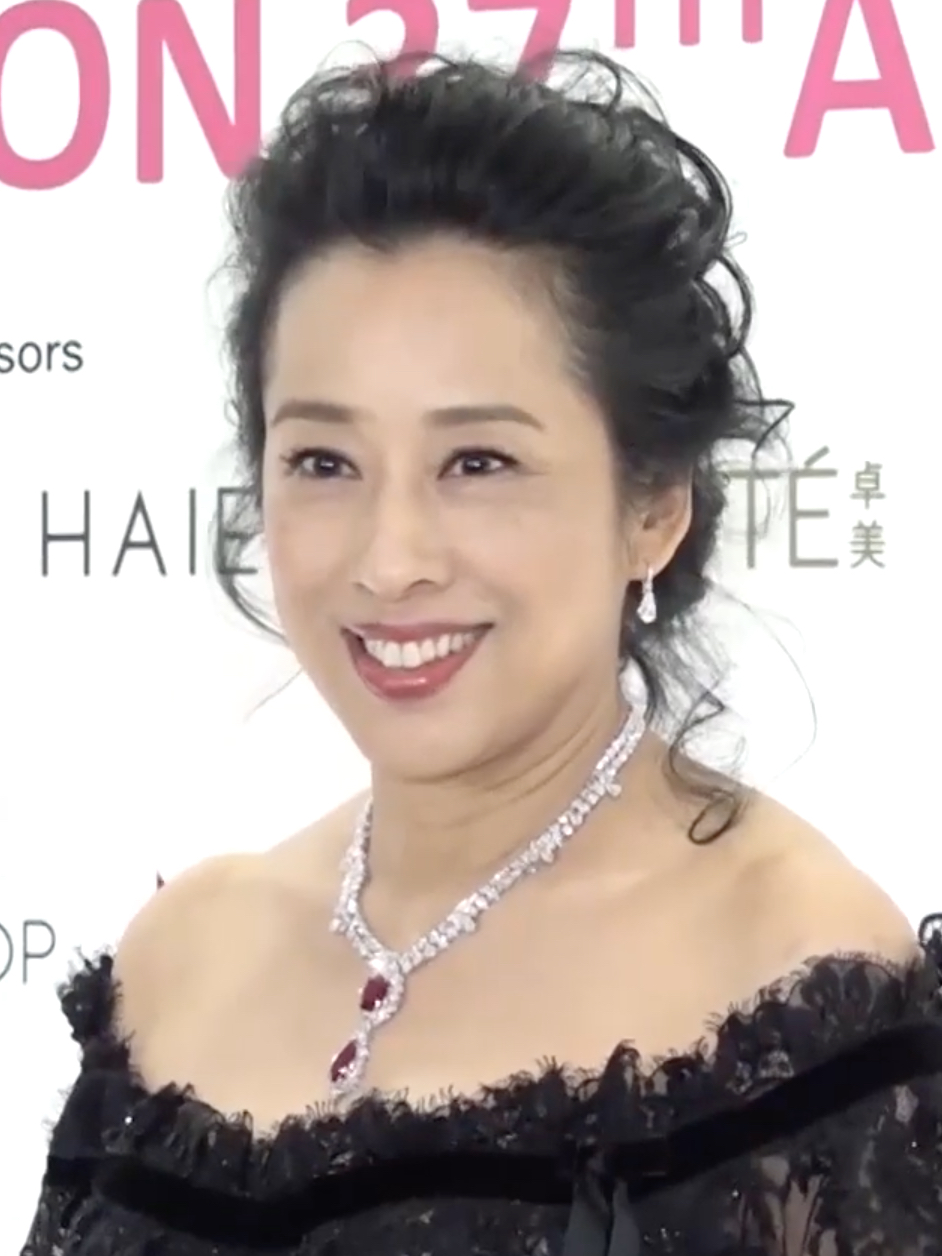
- Chu at the Wai Yin Association's 37th Anniversary Charity Ball 2019 on 4 May 2019
- Born: 7 September 1958 (age 67); Mandalay, Burma
- Education: Hong Kong International School; King George V School
- Spouses: Timothy Fok (m. 1978–2004) Vincent Lo (m. 2008)
- Children: Kenneth Fok; Eric Fok; Jeremy Fok
- Parent(s): Chu Kei-chung (father), Chan Yue-mei (mother)

Loletta Chu
- Chinese: 朱玲玲
Transcriptions
Standard Mandarin
- Hanyu Pinyin: Zhū Línglíng
- Wade–Giles: Chu Ling-Ling
Yue: Cantonese
- Yale Romanization: Jyū Lìhng-lìhng
- Jyutping: Zyu1 Ling4-ling4
- IPA: Cantonese pronunciation: [tɕʰŷː lȉŋlȉŋ]

Loletta Chu (born 7 September 1958 in Mandalay, Myanmar) is a Chinese actress and beauty pageant titleholder. She was the winner of the 1977 Miss Hong Kong Pageant.

== Early life ==
Chu was born in Mandalay, Myanmar, in 1958 into an ethnic Chinese family, with roots in Taishan, Guangdong, China. In 1968 she and her family moved to Hong Kong, where she attended St. Teresa School, Hong Kong International School and King George V School. She did some modelling in her teen years.

== 1977 Miss Hong Kong ==
She participated in the 1977 Miss Hong Kong Pageant and became the first candidate to win both the title as well as a second, Miss Photogenic. Coincidentally, ever since Chu won both titles, the winner of the title Miss Photogenic became a good indication of who would eventually be the winner, or runners-up, of the competition. She represented Hong Kong at Miss Universe 1977 in the Dominican Republic.

== Personal life ==
She is the former wife of the late tycoon and philanthropist Henry Fok's son, Timothy, with whom she has three sons, Kenneth, Eric and Jeremy.

Chu and Fok announced their divorce in September 2006, after more than two decades of marriage. She remarried, to Hong Kong real estate billionaire Vincent Lo of Shui On Group, in Four Seasons Hotels and Resorts, Singapore in November 2008.

Achievements
Preceded by Rowena Lam	Miss Hong Kong; 1977	Succeeded by Winnie Chan
