= Raymond Chien =

Hong Kong businessman and politician

Raymond Ch'ien Kuo-fung GBS，CBE，JP

Chairman of the Hang Seng Bank
- Incumbent
- Assumed office 6 August 2007
- Preceded by: Michael Roger Pearson Smith

Chairman of the MTR Corporation
- In office 21 July 2003 – 31 December 2015
- Preceded by: Jack So
- Succeeded by: Frederick Ma

Unofficial Member of the Executive Council of Hong Kong
- In office 1992 – 1 July 2002

Personal details
- Born: 26 January 1952 (age 74) Tokyo, Japan
- Spouse: Whang Hwee-Leng
- Education: University of Pennsylvania

Raymond Chien
- Traditional Chinese: 錢果豐
- Simplified Chinese: 钱果丰
Transcriptions
Standard Mandarin
- Hanyu Pinyin: Qián Guǒfēng
Yue: Cantonese
- Jyutping: cin4 gwo2 fung1

Raymond Ch'ien Kuo-fung GBS CBE JP (Chinese: 錢果豐, born 26 January 1952), also known as Raymond Ch'ien, is a Hong Kong businessman and former politician.

== Career ==
He is director of The Wharf Ltd. and HSBC; former non-executive chairman of MTR Corporation Limited until 2015 and chairman of CDC Corporation. He was a director of HSBC Holdings until 2007, when he became Chairman of Hang Seng Bank.

He chairs the Advisory Committee on Corruption of the Independent Commission Against Corruption and the Chairman of the Hong Kong/European Union Business Cooperation Committee, and is a Hong Kong member of the APEC Business Advisory Council. He was also a member of the Executive Council of Hong Kong from 1992 to June 2002 under both British Administration and HKSAR. He was the chairman of St Stephen's College Council.

In January 2013, he was re-appointed MTR Corporation Chairman. He held this position until December 2015.

== Honours ==
He was appointed the justice of the peace in 1993; named Commander of the Order of the British Empire in 1994 and awarded the Gold Bauhinia Star Medal in 1999.

Business positions
Preceded by M. R. P. Smith	Chairman of the Hang Seng Bank; 2007–present	Incumbent
Preceded by Jack So	Chairman of the MTR Corporation Limited; 2003–2015	Succeeded by Frederick Ma
Order of precedence
Preceded by Benjamin Liu; Recipients of the Gold Bauhinia Star	Hong Kong order of precedence Recipients of the Gold Bauhinia Star	Succeeded by Katherine Fok; Recipients of the Gold Bauhinia Star
