= Airport Authority Hong Kong =

Operator of Hong Kong International Airport

- 香港機場管理局

Agency overview
- Formed: 1 December 1995; 30 years ago
- Jurisdiction: Hong Kong
- Headquarters: Hong Kong International Airport
- Employees: 2,602 (March 2019)
- Agency executives: Vivian Cheung Kar-fay, CEO; Fred Lam Tin-fuk, Chairman
- Parent agency: Statutory body of the Government of Hong Kong
- Website: Official website

Airport Authority Hong Kong
- Traditional Chinese: 香港機場管理局
- Simplified Chinese: 香港机场管理局
Transcriptions
Standard Mandarin
- Hanyu Pinyin: Xiānggǎng Jīchǎng Guǎnlǐ Jú
Yue: Cantonese
- Yale Romanization: Hēung góng gēi chèuhng gún léih guhk
- Jyutping: Hoeng^{1} gong^{2} gei^{1} coeng^{4} gun^{2} lei^{5} guk^{6}

AAHK
- Traditional Chinese: 機管局
- Simplified Chinese: 机管局
Transcriptions
Standard Mandarin
- Hanyu Pinyin: Jīguǎnjú
Yue: Cantonese
- Jyutping: gei^{1} gun^{2} guk^{6}

The Airport Authority Hong Kong (AA or AAHK) is the statutory body of the government of Hong Kong that is responsible for the operations of the Hong Kong International Airport. It is governed by the Airport Authority Ordinance (Cap. 483).

== History ==
The authority was formed on 1 December 1995 (initially as the Provisional Airport Authority in 1990) through Airport Authority Ordinance and is independent of the government financially. There are plans to corporatise the AA and to list it on the Hong Kong Stock Exchange and to partially sell it to the public.

A convention and exhibition facility, the AsiaWorld–Expo, on the northeastern corner of the island of Chek Lap Kok was opened on 21 December 2005.

On 17 January 2005, the AA acquired 49% stake of Hangzhou Xiaoshan International Airport, with HK$ 1.99 billion, compared to bids by Singapore Changi Airport, Copenhagen Airport, Houston International Airport and BAA plc. A new holding company of Xiaoshan Airport will be formed and be listed on the Hong Kong Stock Exchange.

On 17 February 2006, the AA confirmed it will hold 55% stake in a company that operates the Zhuhai Airport, with the remaining 45% owned by Zhuhai Airport. The company will not own the assets or the liabilities of the airport.

In 2017, the Airport Authority approved a HKD $140 billion (US$18 billion) expansion for Hong Kong International Airport.

In 2023, as part of COVID-19 recovery following the relaxation of the Government's travel restrictions, the Airport Authority announced a "World of Winners" campaign. The campaign aimed to provide 500,000 heavily subsidised tickets to promote tourism in Hong Kong. The airlines providing the tickets were Cathay Pacific, HK Express, Hong Kong Airlines and Greater Bay Airlines, and these airlines determined the allocation of the tickets.

== Operations ==
AAHK is headquartered at HKIA Tower, which is connected to the airport terminal. The Airport Authority employs 2,900 staff in total.

== CCTV controversy ==
In March 2013 an airline passenger witnessed a suspected theft in the baggage reclaim hall of Chek Lap Kok Airport. He reported the theft to airport staff, who did nothing. The passenger then contacted the Airport Authority to enquire on the availability of CCTV footage of the incident. Airport Authority staff responded that the cameras were used only for real-time monitoring.

Legislative councillor Alice Mak asked for clarification on behalf of the passenger. It was revealed that the CCTV system does have a recording function. The AAHK added that "the staff concerned, who were not honest in this instance, have been suitably admonished".

The case was investigated by the Office of the Ombudsman, which released a report in January 2015. The report noted that the AAHK training material instructs staff to answer enquiries about CCTV with the response, "CCTVs are used for real time surveillance only", which is a lie. The Ombudsman alleged that "AA's statement that the staff concerned were not honest was therefore grossly unfair" and that "we consider knowingly constructing a standard response which contains false information totally unacceptable." The Ombudsman considered the complaint against AAHK substantiated and recommended the authority review its CCTV policies and procedures and provide customer service training that "would not compromise the honesty and transparency of AA." The Airport Authority responded that the incident was isolated, and that it had implemented the recommendations made by the Ombudsman.
