= Hang Seng China-Affiliated Corporations Index =

Hong Kong stock index

- Traditional Chinese: 恒生香港中資企業指數
- Simplified Chinese: 恒生香港中资企业指数
- Jyutping: Hang^{4}saang^{1} Hoeng^{1}gong^{2} Zung^{1}zi^{1} Kei^{5}jip^{6} Zi^{2}sou^{3}
- Cantonese Yale: Hàhngsāang Hēunggóng Jūngjī Kéihyihp Jísou
- Hanyu Pinyin: Héngshēng Xiānggǎng Zhōngzī Qǐyè Zhǐshù
Transcriptions
Standard Mandarin
- Hanyu Pinyin: Héngshēng Xiānggǎng Zhōngzī Qǐyè Zhǐshù
Yue: Cantonese
- Yale Romanization: Hàhngsāang Hēunggóng Jūngjī Kéihyihp Jísou
- Jyutping: Hang^{4}saang^{1} Hoeng^{1}gong^{2} Zung^{1}zi^{1} Kei^{5}jip^{6} Zi^{2}sou^{3}

The Hang Seng China-Affiliated Corporations Index (HSCCI) is a stock index of the Stock Exchange of Hong Kong for red chip companies listed on the exchange, which are incorporated outside of mainland China, such as in Bermuda, the Cayman Islands, or Hong Kong, but are majority-owned by the central or regional government of the People's Republic of China.

As of January 2021, there are 25 red chips that compose this index.

In the past, the constituents of Hang Seng China-Affiliated Corporations Index did not intersect with H shares' Hang Seng China Enterprises Index, as H share and red chip companies did not intersect. But a possible inclusion of the top red chip companies to Hang Seng China Enterprises Index, was announced in August 2017.

Some of the constituents of Hang Seng China-Affiliated Corporations Index was also the constituents of Hang Seng Index (the blue-chip index). They were sometimes known as purple-chip, since red plus blue is purple.

== Constituents ==
As of January 2021

Corporation name	Stock symbol
Kunlun Energy	(SEHK: 135)
China Merchants Port	(SEHK: 144)
Shenzhen International	(SEHK: 152)
China Everbright Limited	(SEHK: 165)
Everbright Environment	(SEHK: 257)
CITIC Limited	(SEHK: 267)
Guangdong Investment	(SEHK: 270)
China Resources Beer	(SEHK: 291)
Beijing Enterprises Water Group	(SEHK: 371)
Beijing Enterprises	(SEHK: 392)
China Overseas Land and Investment	(SEHK: 688)
China Unicom (Hong Kong) Limited	(SEHK: 762)
China Jinmao	(SEHK: 817)
China Resources Power	(SEHK: 836)
CNOOC Limited	(SEHK: 883)
China Mobile	(SEHK: 941)
China Taiping	(SEHK: 966)
Semiconductor Manufacturing International Corporation	(SEHK: 981)
China Resources Land	(SEHK: 1109)
Brilliance China Auto	(SEHK: 1114)
China Resources Gas	(SEHK: 1193)
China Resources Cement	(SEHK: 1313)
Mengniu Dairy	(SEHK: 2319)
China Resources Pharmaceutical	(SEHK: 3320)
Sinotruk (Hong Kong)	(SEHK: 3808)

== See also ==
- Hang Seng Index - blue chip index of the Stock Exchange of Hong Kong
- Hang Seng China Enterprises Index - index for H share of the Stock Exchange of Hong Kong
