= MixC World (Shenzhen) =

Coordinates: 22.54504°N 113.95123°E

- 万象天地
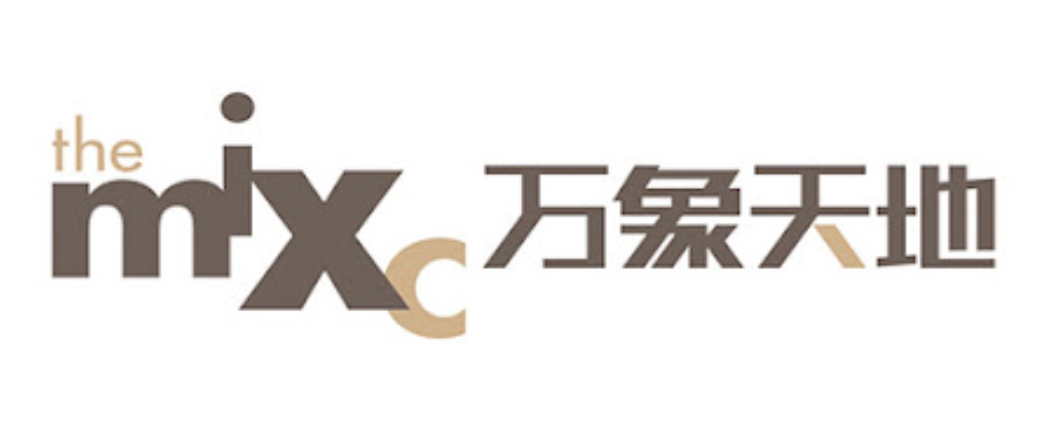

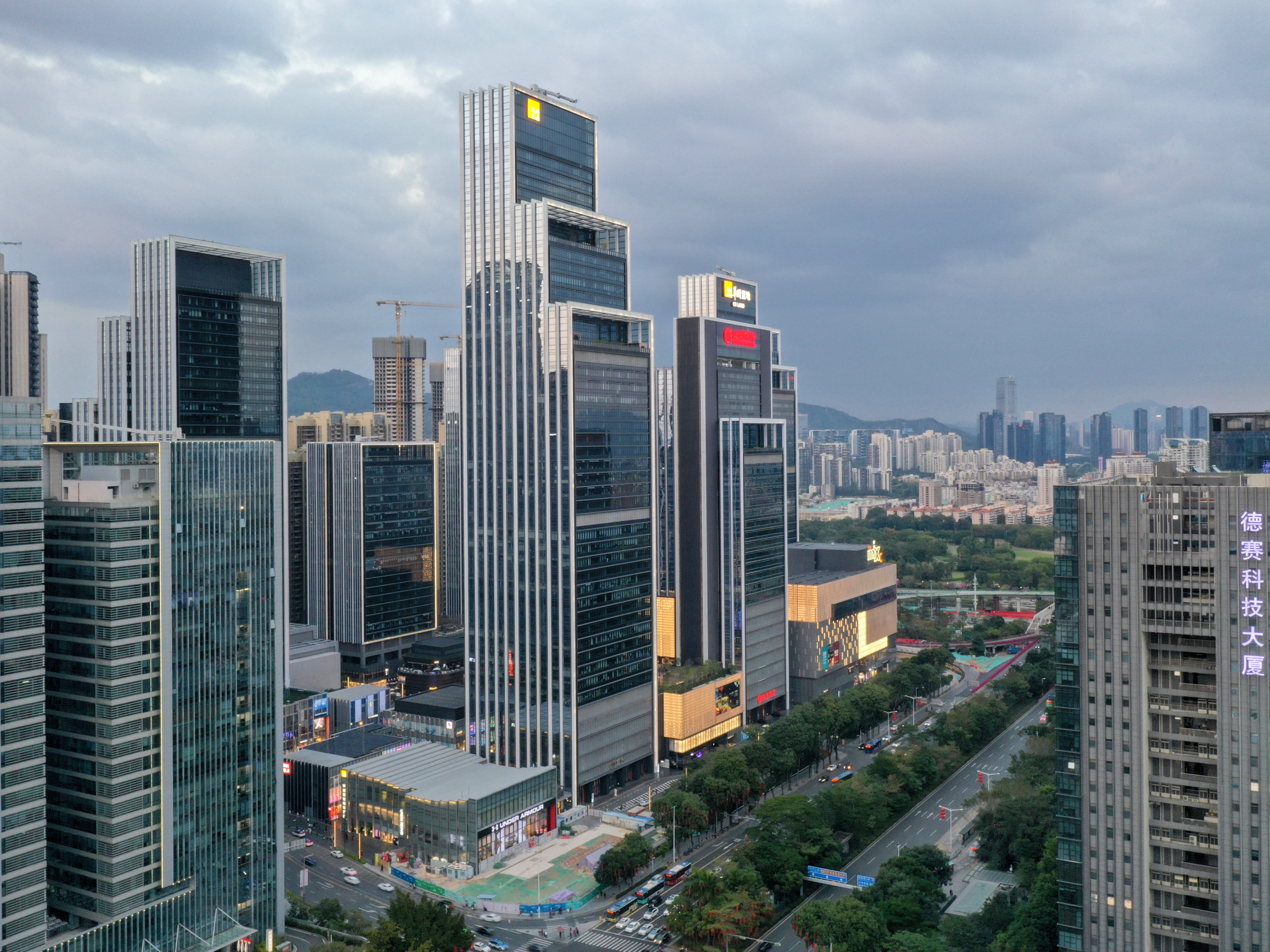
- Aerial View of MixC World
- Location: Nanshan, Shenzhen
- Address: 19 Kefa Road, Nanshan, Shenzhen
- Opened: 27 September 2017
- Developer: China Resources Land
- Manager: China Resources Mixc Lifestyle
- Architect: CallisonRTKL
- Floor area: 260,000 sqm
- Floors: 10 (B3-LG; L1-L6)
- Public transit: Hi-Tech Park, Line 1, Shenzhen Metro

MixC World (Simplified Chinese: 万象天地; Traditional Chinese: 萬象天地) is a mixed use urban redevelopment project in Nanshan, Shenzhen, situated on the site of former Dachong Village (Chinese: 大沖村). The site sits next to Dasha River (Chinese: 大沙河) and its riverside promenade, surrounded by a tech-business park known as Hi-Tech Park. China Resources Land, subsidiary of China Resources Group that operates numerous MixC-branded malls nationally, is the sole developer of this complex. New York-based firm Link-Arc was the masterplanner and CallisonRTKL (now part of engineering conglomorate Arcadis) was in charge of architectural design.

The development comprises 5 office towers, one 10-storey indoor shopping center with an annex, and an open-air shopping and dining area. The complex was developed as a TOD (Transit Oriented Development), Level B1 of the mall is connected to Exit A of Hi-Tech Park station, on Line 1 of Shenzhen Metro.

== Layout ==
=== Office Towers ===
Of the total 6 office towers, 5 are completed and opened to public with rest of the complex in 2017 and 1 remains under construction as of 2025; the main occupant includes owner China Resources, and major state-owned Bank of Beijing.

=== Indoor Shopping Mall ===
The 10-storey shopping center houses international clothing brands such as Kenzo, eateries, upscale supermarket Olé', and a theater. The annex previously leased to Taiwanese bookseller Eslite until December, 2020 when it shuttered, is currently leased to Haus Nowhere, a boutique department store co-operated by Korean eyewhere brand Gentle Monster.

=== Open Air Shopping Street ===
MixC World
- Traditional Chinese: 萬象天地
- Simplified Chinese: 万象天地
Transcriptions
Standard Mandarin
- Hanyu Pinyin: wàn xiàng tiān dì
Yue: Cantonese
- Jyutping: maan6 zoeng6 tin1 dei2

The open air area comprises several tree-shaded plazas with seating areas and two main clusters, cut through by public roads Kerong St. and Dachong 2nd Rd.(although they are de facto closed to vehicle traffic).

The southwestern corner facing Shennan Avenue is mostly leased to clothing brands, featuring a 2-storey Uniqlo shop. To its north and half-storey above, an escalator and stairs connect the central square centered with glass-facaded flagship Huawei store.

"High Street", the shaded two-storey al fresco dining street runs east–west to the north of central square, leading up to the fountain square. The Fountain Square is highlighted by a giant elephant figure sitting on top of the mall, and a musical fountain. North of the square sit a sunken square connecting the mall's food court on level LG, and a convertible event space. The event space is currently occupied by pop-up retail and dining section, featuring Korean eatery bbq chicken.

Kerong St. running parallel to "High Street" leads to a gate to the indoor mall, where U.S.- based cafe Blue Bottle Coffee opened its first outlet in Shenzhen.

== Gallery ==
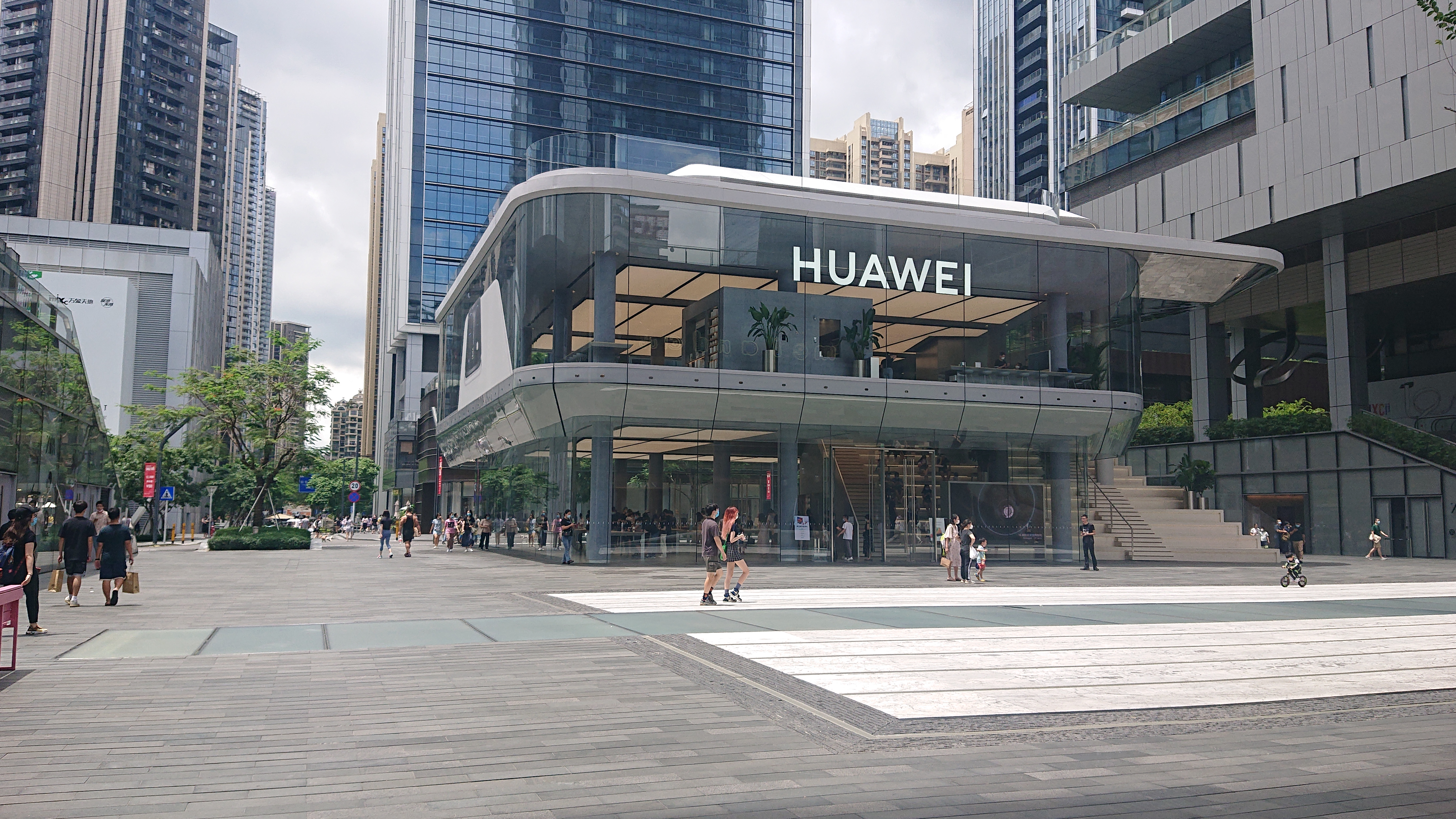

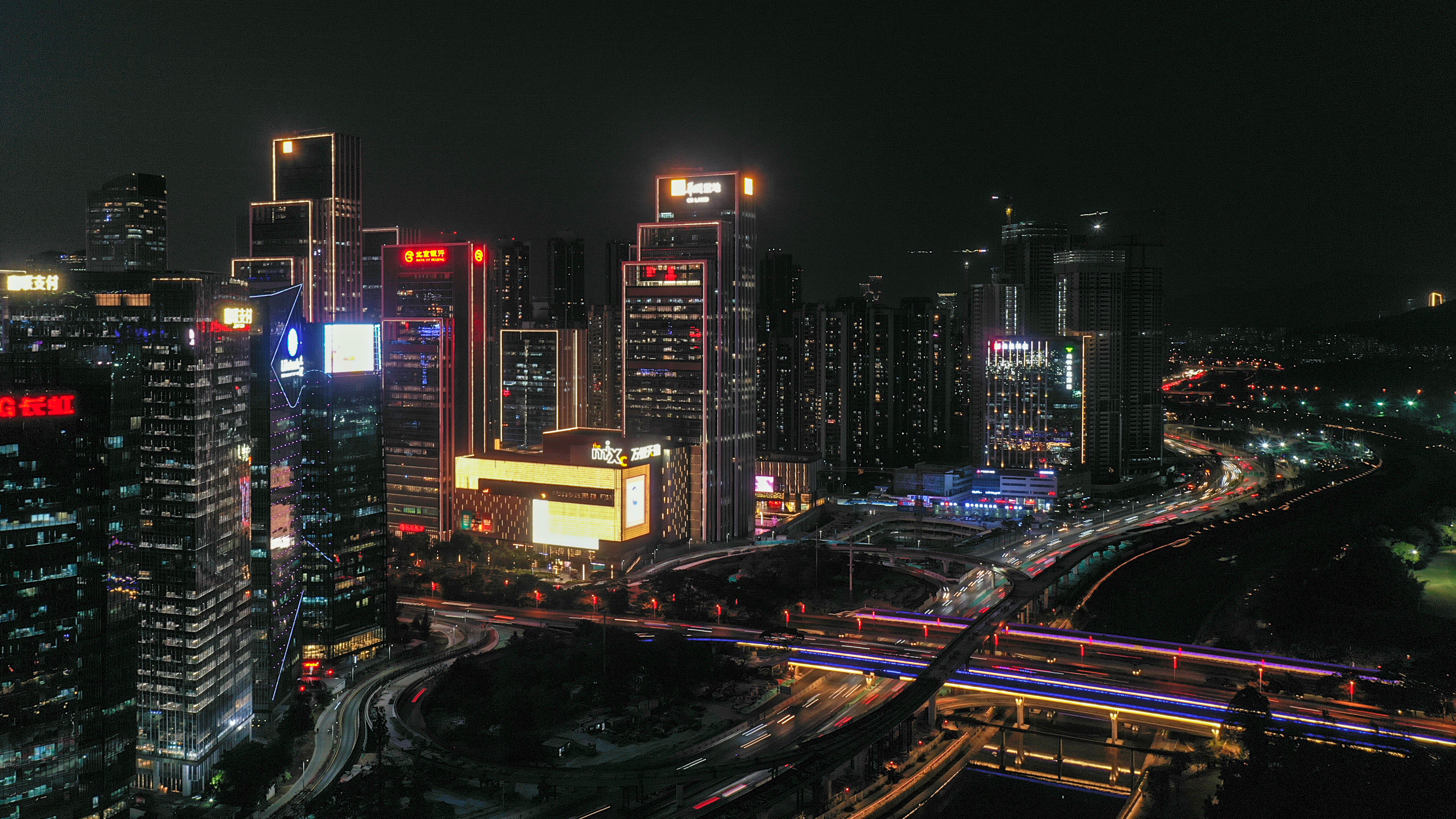

== See also ==
- China Resources
- China Resources Land
- China Resources Headquarters
