= Li Jianjun =

Chinese journalist (born 1977)

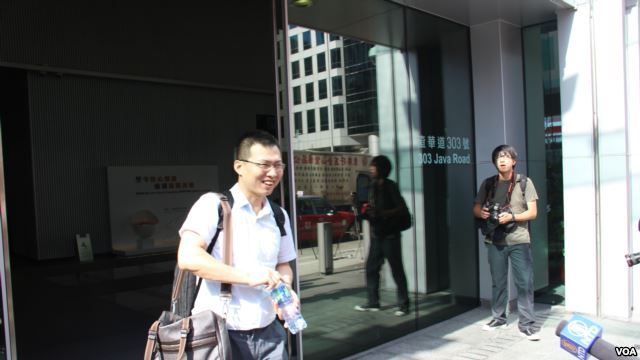
Li Jianjun

Li Jianjun (simplified Chinese: 李建军; traditional Chinese: 李建軍; born 1977) is an investigative journalist in the People's Republic of China from Shanxi province. He is best known for speaking out against the corruption of the state-run conglomerate China Resources located in Hong Kong. In 2014 he was recognized by Reporters Without Borders as one of the "100 Information Heroes".

== Early years ==
Li was a reporter for Shanxi evening news. He also worked on corruption cases on police in the mainland. On 17 February 2011 Li was dismissed.

== Investigative work ==
=== China Resources case ===
Between 2012 and 2013 Li took on investigation against the state-run conglomerate China Resources and three mining companies in Shanxi. The illegal profiteering in the nationalization of Shanxi coal mining has been going on for years.

For more than four months Li had been airing information against Song Lin, chairman of China Resources. Li said Song purchased several coal mines in Shanxi for more than 10 billion yuan and suspicious deals were being pushed into the Hong Kong-listed subsidiaries. Li tried to present the materials to three newspapers, and none showed any interest in publishing the article. To stay close to the case, Li purchased 4,000 shares of China resources stock and formed his own investigation team. In July 2013 as a minority shareholder, Li sued 20 directors who held offices in the last three years. The case requested Hong Kong High Court to act against the 20 directors including former Secretary for Justice Elsie Leung, MTR chairman Raymond Chien and Song Lin. In August 2013 Li took the corruption files to the ICAC in Hong Kong. Following an investigation by the Chinese Communist Party's Central Commission for Discipline Inspection, Chairman Song Lin and two other corrupt executives were removed on April 19, 2014.

== 2014 ATV interview ==
Prior to bringing the case to Hong Kong's ICAC, Li was very confident in the case. A few months after the case on 30 October 2014, Li made a guest appearance on the HK ATV show News Bar Talk (把酒當歌) at the time of the 2014 Hong Kong protest. There he expressed his disappointment in Hong Kong.

In the interview Li pointed out the mainland injected $20 billion yuan into China Resources only to watch the money vaporize in Hong Kong. He explained Hong Kong was experiencing high levels of corruption, since the ICAC was useless with Song Lin heading the Hong Kong Ethics Development Advisory Committee (道德委員會). During the China Resources case, he said the Hong Kong High Court was withholding evidence. He proclaimed Hong Kong as the most failed financial system in the world to let these politicians go unarrested. Elsie Leung, who was supposed to watch over 58 mainland firms, let China Resources run wild. Hong Kong Stock Exchange's regulations applied to Hong Kong companies, but not mainland ones. That is why some mainland investors (like Jack Ma) are going directly to the American stock exchanges now. Li slammed Chief Executive CY Leung's decision to give Song Lin a justice of the peace appointment on 1 July 2013 while Elsie Leung was working with China Resources.

Li further mentioned in the interview that because of corruption in Shanxi, a "blood change process" (換血) had to take place to replace the entire line of government workers with a new group of workers. He highlighted Shanxi and Sichuan province as the most corrupted on the mainland.

== Recognition ==
In 2014 Li was named by Reporters Without Borders as one of the journalists on the first ever list of "100 Information Heroes". Four Chinese citizens were included on the list. Of these, Li is the only one not facing persecution, though he had been fired from his job and faced death threats as well as kidnapping attempts.
