= Eurizon Capital =

Italian asset manager

Eurizon Capital SGR

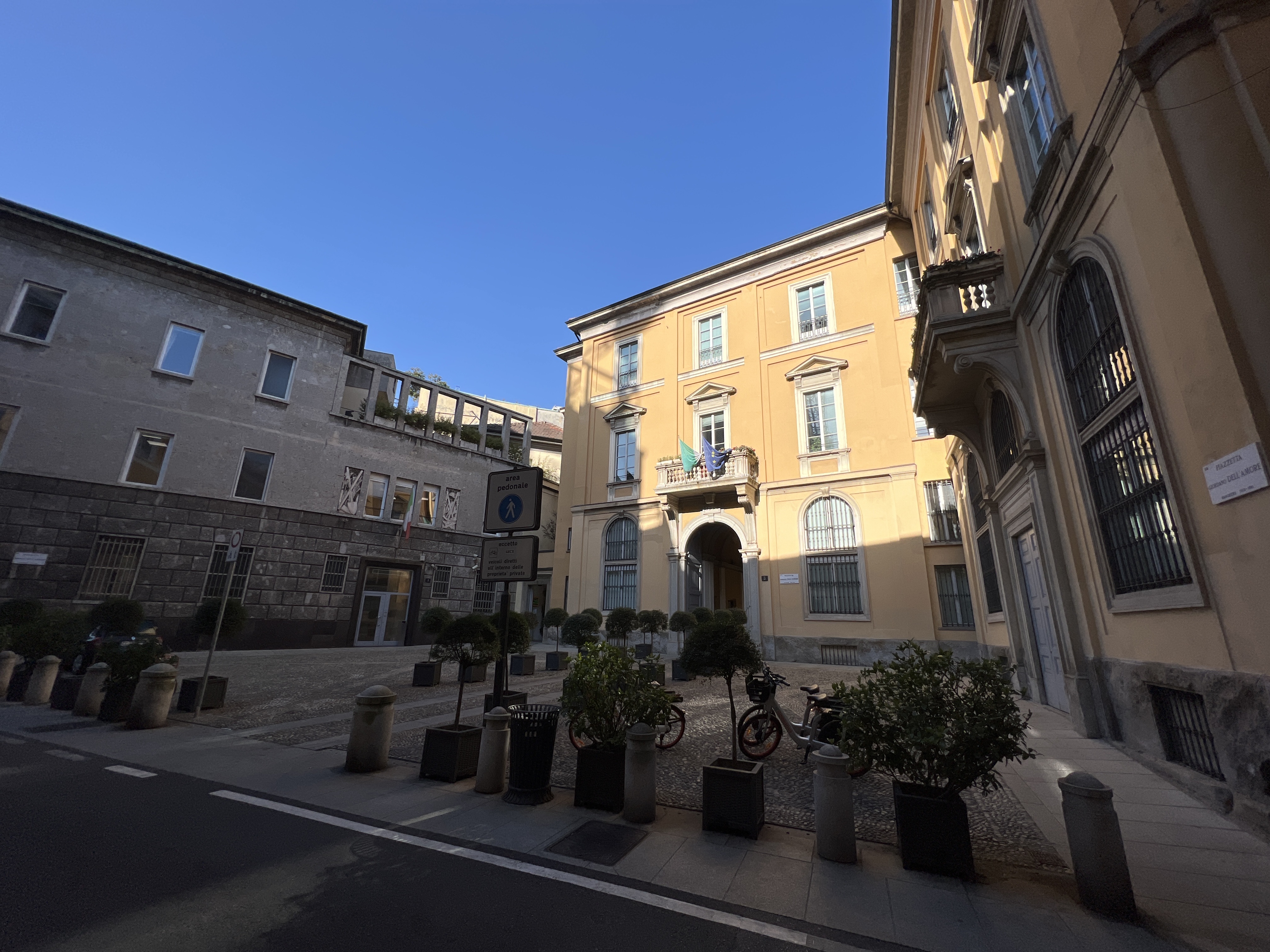
- Headquarters in Milan
- Company type: Subsidiary
- Industry: Investment management
- Founded: 22 December 1983; 42 years ago
- Headquarters: Milan, Italy
- Key people: Andrea Beltratti (chairman); Saverio Perissinotto (CEO)
- AUM: €413billion (Q3 2025)
- Parent: Intesa Sanpaolo
- Subsidiaries: Penghua Fund Management
- Website: www.eurizoncapital.com

Eurizon Capital SGR (also known as Eurizon and Eurizon Asset Management) is an asset management firm headquartered in Milan. It is the asset management division of Intesa Sanpaolo, Italy's largest banking group. It is considered to be one of the largest asset management companies in Europe by assets under management.

== History ==
The roots of Eurizon Capital can be traced back to the asset management division of Sanpaolo that was established near the end of 1983.

In 2005, Sanpaolo IMI established the subsidiary unit, Eurizon Financial Group which would encompass it's insurance and asset management business.

In August 2006, Banca Intesa and Sanpaolo IMI agreed to merge to form Intesa Sanpaolo. During this time, there were plans to hold an initial public offering of the Eurizon Financial Group unit but it was delayed.

On 1 November 2006, Sanpaolo IMI Asset Management SGR changed its name to Eurizon Capital SGR after it was incorporated into the Eurizon Financial Group.

In April 2007, Eurizon Financial Group acquired a 49% stake in Penghua Fund Management, a Chinese asset manager based in Shenzhen. The other holder of the joint venture is Guosen Securities that holds 50%.

In June 2007, the plans to list the Eurizon Financial Group were scrapped and Intesa Sanpaolo decided to break it up into three businesses. Currently only Eurizon Capital retains the Eurizon brand name.

In 2015, Eurizon Capital opened an office in Paris and since then has continued to expand its presence in Europe afterwards by opening additional offices in Croatia, Frankfurt, Hungary, Luxembourg, Madrid, Slovakia and Zurich.

On 4 July 2016, Eurizon Capital established Eurizon SLJ Capital Ltd. after acquiring SLJ Macro Partners LLP, a London based hedge fund that specializes in the foreign exchange market.

In 2018, Eurizon Capital decided to expand its business into Asia-Pacific and started hiring more staff in Hong Kong and China to support its operations.

In December 2019, the subsidiary Eurizon Capital Real Asset SGR was set up to invest in real assets. In 2021, Poste Italiane through its subsidiaries, Poste Vita and BancoPosta Fondi SGR acquired a 40% stake in the subsidiary.

Since 2012, Andrea Beltratti has been the chairman of Eurizon Capital.
