= Shenzhen International =

Shenzhen International can refer to:

- Shenzhen International Holdings, Chinese holding company
- Shenzhen International (golf), Chinese golf tournament
