= Andaz Shenzhen Bay =

Skyscraper in Shenzhen, Guangdong, China

- 深圳湾安达仕酒店
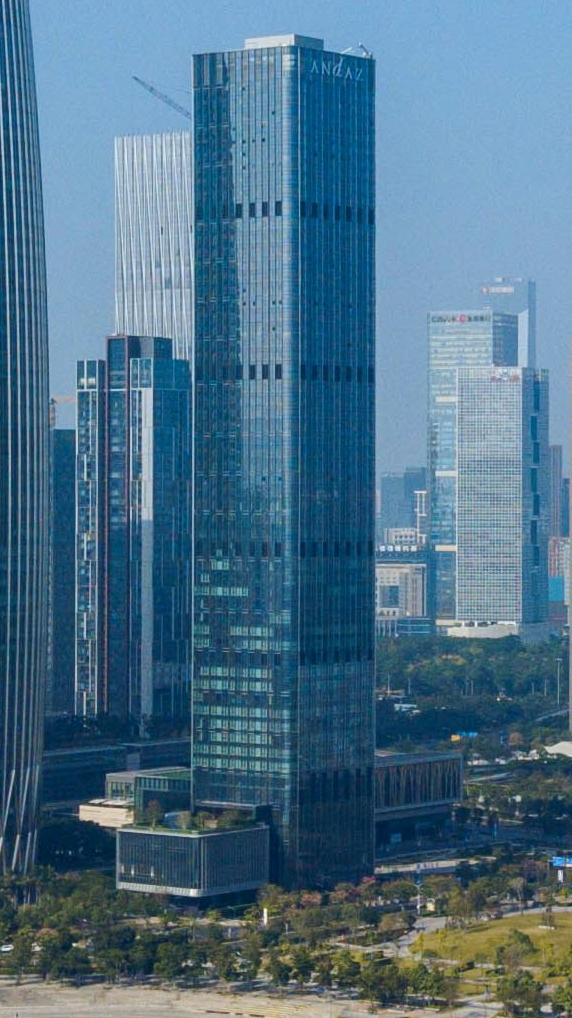
- Andaz Shenzhen Bay in December 2020
- Interactive map of the Andaz Shenzhen Bay area

General information
- Status: Completed
- Type: Hotel/Residential
- Location: 2600 Keyuan South Road, Nanshan District, Shenzhen, Guangdong, China
- Coordinates: 22°31′5.5″N 113°56′33″E
- Construction started: 2015
- Completed: 2021

Height
- Height: 246 metres (807.1 ft)

Technical details
- Floor count: 58

Design and construction
- Architect: Goettsch Partners

Andaz Shenzhen Bay (Chinese: 深圳湾安达仕酒店) is a mixed-use 246 metres (807.1 ft) tall skyscraper in Shenzhen, Guangdong, China. The tower is near multiple supertall skyscrapers such as the China Resources Headquarters and the One Shenzhen Bay. Construction started in 2015 and was completed in 2021.

== See also ==
- China Resources Headquarters
- One Shenzhen Bay
- List of tallest buildings in Shenzhen
