= China Jinmao =

China Jinmao Holdings Group Limited 中国金茂控股集团有限公司
- Type: State-owned enterprise (Red chip)
- Industry: Real estate
- Founded: 2004
- Headquarters: Hong Kong, People's Republic of China
- Area served: People's Republic of China
- Key people: Chairman: Mr. Pan Zhengyi
- Parent: Sinochem Corporation
- Website: Franshion Properties (China) Limited

China Jinmao Holdings Group Limited (SEHK: 817), the subsidiary of state-owned Sinochem Corporation, is engaged in real estate development in Shanghai, Beijing and Zhuhai. It is incorporated and headquartered in Hong Kong, but its business is mainly in Mainland China. Its former name was "Franshion Properties (China) Limited".

It was listed on the Hong Kong Stock Exchange on 17 August 2007. It joined Hang Seng China-Affiliated Corporations Index Constitute Stock (red chip) on 10 March 2008.

== See also ==
- Real estate in China
