= Ng Fung Hong =

- Native name: 五豐行
- Company type: State-owned enterprise
- Industry: wholesale food
- Headquarters: Hong Kong
- Area served: Mainland China; Hong Kong
- Parent: China Resources
- Website: China Resources

Ng Fung Hong (Chinese: 五豐行) is a Chinese company, which is owned by China Resources and listed in Hong Kong. It describes itself as the largest food distributor in Hong Kong, with interests in food distribution; food production, processing and trading; food retail and supermarket; marine fishing; and abattoir operations.

== History ==
Ng Fung Hong was founded in Hong Kong in 1951 as "a modest trading agent in Bonham Strand". Two decades later it became part of mainland giant China Resources, and is now a vertically integrated food enterprise "under the auspices of China's Ministry of [Commerce]".

On 25 October 1995, the company was listed on the Hong Kong Stock Exchange.

In 1998, the company made a net profit of HK$525.1 million.

== Beef monopoly ==
The company is the only agent endorsed by the China Ministry of Commerce to export live cattle to Hong Kong. This monopoly is of concern to the Hong Kong and Chinese governments.

In January 2013, the Hong Kong Secretary for Food and Health, Dr Ko Wing-man, announced an investigation into the supply of meat from the mainland, with the aim of breaking the Ng Fung Hong monopoly, with a result expected by April. Then in 2013, the Chinese ministry reportedly undertook to consider reform of Hong Kong's live cattle supply to break the beef monopoly "once industry and government agree". A Legislative Council panel urged action on the matter by the Hong Kong government, which at this time said it was non-committal.
