= Penghua Fund Management =

Chinese asset manager

Penghua Fund Management Co., Ltd.
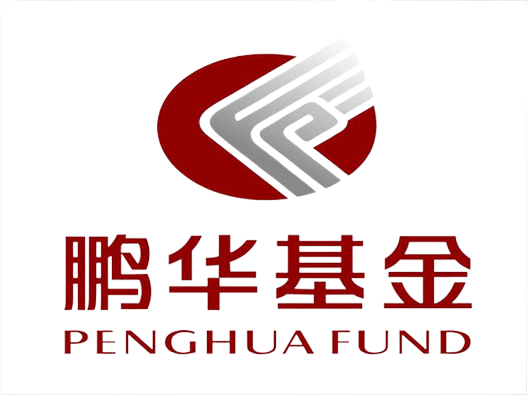
- Native name: 鹏华基金管理有限公司
- Company type: Joint venture
- Industry: Financial services
- Founded: 22 December 1998; 27 years ago
- Headquarters: Shenzhen, Guangdong China
- Key people: He Ru (chairman); Deng Zhaoming (general manager)
- AUM: US$159 billion (June 2023)
- Owners: Guosen Securities (50%); Eurizon Capital (49%); Shenzhen Brillice Investment (1%)
- Website: www.phfund.com.cn

Penghua Fund Management Co., Ltd. (Penghua; Chinese: 鹏华基金管理; pinyin: Pénghuá jījīn guǎnlǐ yǒuxiàn gōngsī) is a Chinese asset management company founded in 1998. It is currently a joint venture between Guosen Securities and Eurizon Capital, the asset management arm of Intesa Sanpaolo.

== History ==
Penghua was established on 22 December 1998, as one of the earliest asset management companies in China. Its original shareholders were four Chinese brokerage houses: Guosen Securities, Zhejiang Securities, Anshan Trust & Investment Corp. and Anhui International Trust & Investment Corp

In August 2000, it was reported that Penghua would sign a cooperation agreement with the Hong Kong unit of Invesco. They also planned to set up a joint venture. The purpose of this was to make use of Invesco's foreign expertise in the growing Chinese stock market. Invesco assisted Penghua in launching one of China's first open-ended mutual funds. However, in October 2002, it was reported that Invesco decided to terminate its cooperation agreement with Penghua and formed a joint venture with Great Wall Securities instead. The rules of the China Securities Regulatory Commission made it difficult for Invesco to set up a joint venture with Penghua as it was already an established fund management company. Penghua had multiple owners and the most prominent one was the Shenzhen municipal government which made negotiations more difficult while Great Wall Securities was owned by Huaneng Power International (51%) and China Merchants Bank (25%).

In April 2007 Eurizon Capital acquired a 49% stake of Penghua from its shareholders with the remaining 50% being held by Guosen Securities and 1% being held by Shenzhen Brillice Investment.

In June 2015, Penghua teamed up with Vanke to the launch the first public real estate investment trust in China, the Penghua-Qianhai-Vanke REIT.

In February 2020, Tommaso Corcos, CEO of Eurizon Capital stated that Eurizon Capital will increase its presence in China through Penghua.
