= China Resources Shenzhen International Trust =

Chinese state-owned investment company

China Resources SZITIC Trust Co., Ltd. 華潤信託
- Type: State-owned enterprise
- Industry: Investment company
- Founded: 1982
- Headquarters: Shenzhen, People's Republic of China
- Area served: People's Republic of China
- Key people: Jiang Wei (Chairman)
- Products: Financial services Banking
- Owner: Central People's Government
- Website: www.crctrust.com

China Resources SZITIC Trust Co., Ltd. (China Resources Trust or Chinese: 華潤信託), part of China Resources Group, is a state-owned investment company of the People's Republic of China, established in 1982. Its headquarters is in Shenzhen, Guangdong Province, China.

Its major business is to provide fund management and financial services to non-bank financial institutions through trust financial supermarket, financial structure of technology, cross-industry, capital and money market.

The current chairman is Jiang Wei, and the current general manager is Meng Yang.

China Resources Trust accounts for 30% stake of Guosen Securities Co., Ltd.
