= China Resources Headquarters =

Supertall skyscraper in Shenzhen, Guangdong, China

China Resources Tower
- 中国华润大厦
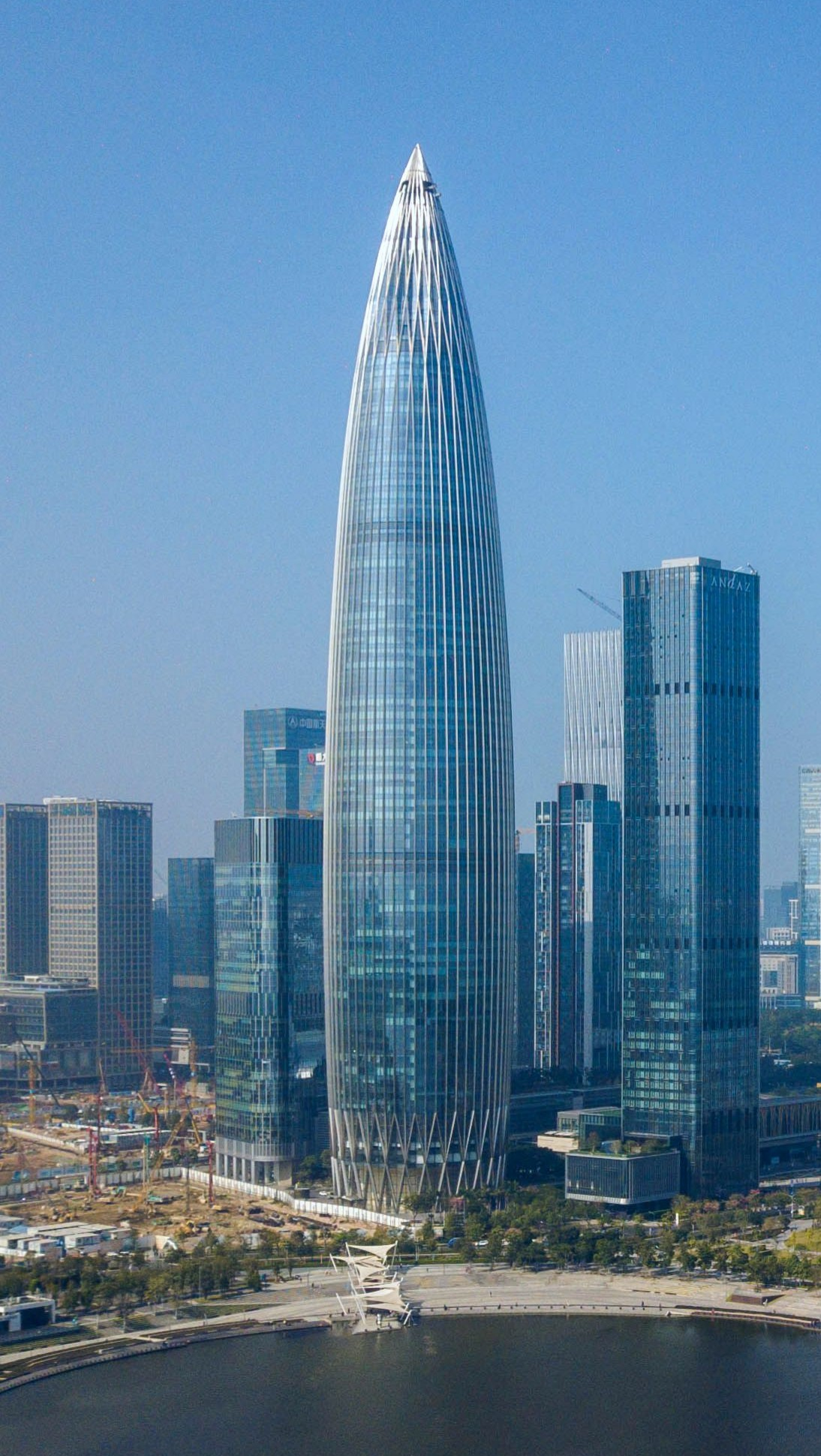
- China Resources Headquarters in December 2020
- Alternative names: Spring Bamboo (春笋)

General information
- Status: Completed
- Type: Office
- Location: 2666 Keyuan South Road, Nanshan District, Shenzhen, Guangdong, China
- Coordinates: 22°31′01″N 113°56′30″E
- Construction started: 2012
- Completed: 2018
- Owner: China Resources

Height
- Architectural: 392.5 m (1,288 ft)
- Tip: 392.5 m (1,288 ft)
- Top floor: 345 m (1,132 ft)

Technical details
- Floor count: 68 (+5 underground floors)
- Floor area: 268,713 m^{2} (2,892,400 sq ft)
- Lifts/elevators: 59

Design and construction
- Architect: Kohn Pedersen Fox
- Developer: China Resources
- Structural engineer: Arup
- Main contractor: China Construction Third Building Group

China Resources Headquarters
- Simplified Chinese: 中国华润大厦
- Traditional Chinese: 中國華潤大廈
Transcriptions
Standard Mandarin
- Hanyu Pinyin: Zhōngguó Huárùn Dàshà
Yue: Cantonese
- Jyutping: zung^{1}gwok^{3} waa^{4}jeon^{6} daai^{6}haa^{6}

China Resources Tower (Chinese: 中国华润大厦; pinyin: zhōngguó huárùn dàshà), colloquially known as the Spring Bamboo (春笋), is a 392.5-metre (1,287.7 ft) supertall skyscraper in Houhai, Nanshan, Shenzhen, Guangdong. Construction started in 2012 and the building topped out on July 1, 2016. It surpassed Shun Hing Square as the 3rd tallest building in Shenzhen upon its completion in 2018. As of 2025, it is the 4th tallest building in the city, following the completion of the China Merchants Bank Tower Global HQ. It is owned by China Resources, which has its headquarters there.

At the foot of the building is the shopping mall named "Shenzhen Bay MixC", together with basement carparks. Subways connect the shopping mall with Shenzhen Bay Sports Centre and Shenzhen Metro Line 11 Houhai Station.

== Gallery ==
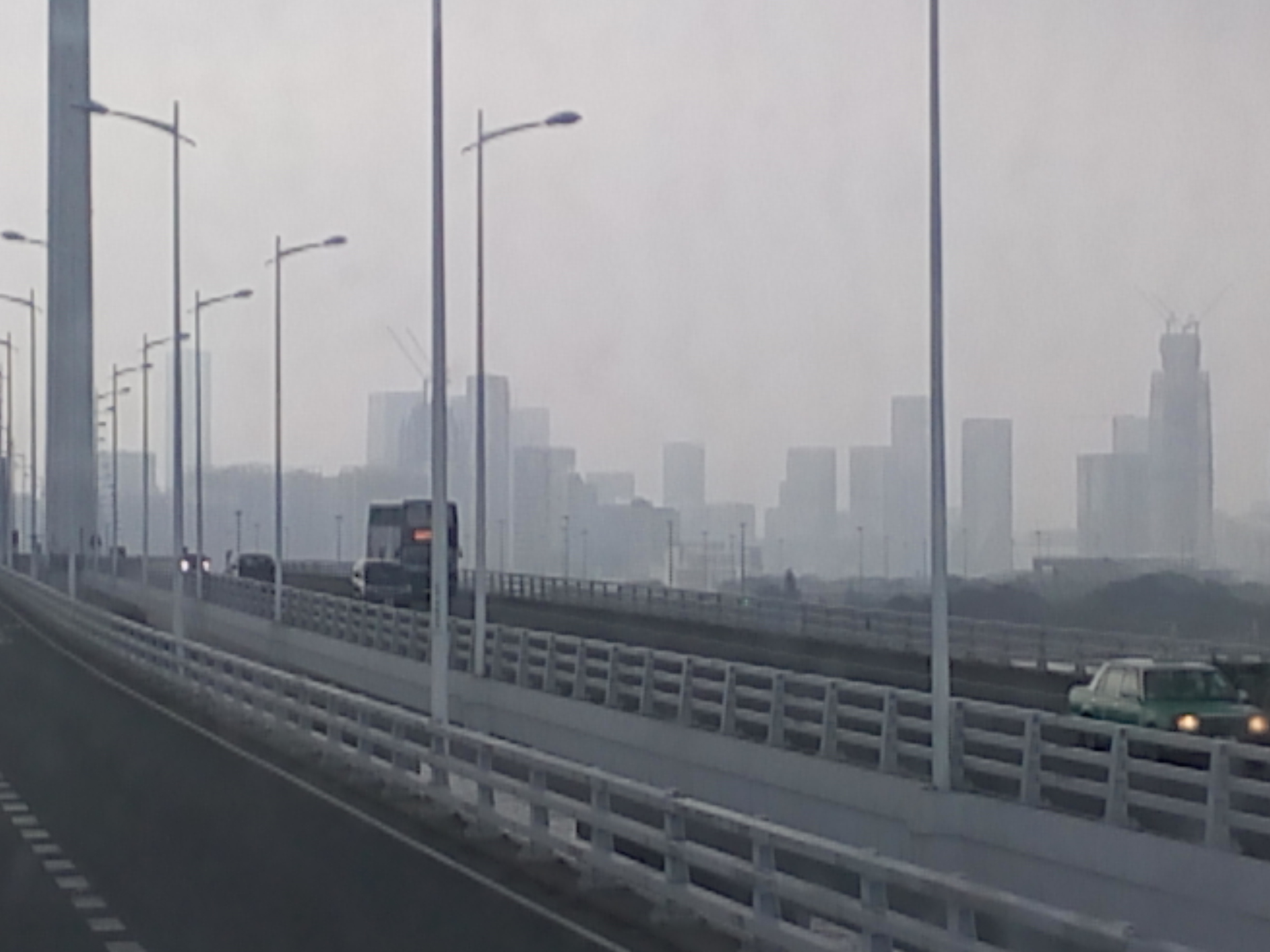
China Resources Headquarters (tallest building under construction on the far right) and other skyscrapers in Houhai as viewed from Shenzhen Bay Bridge

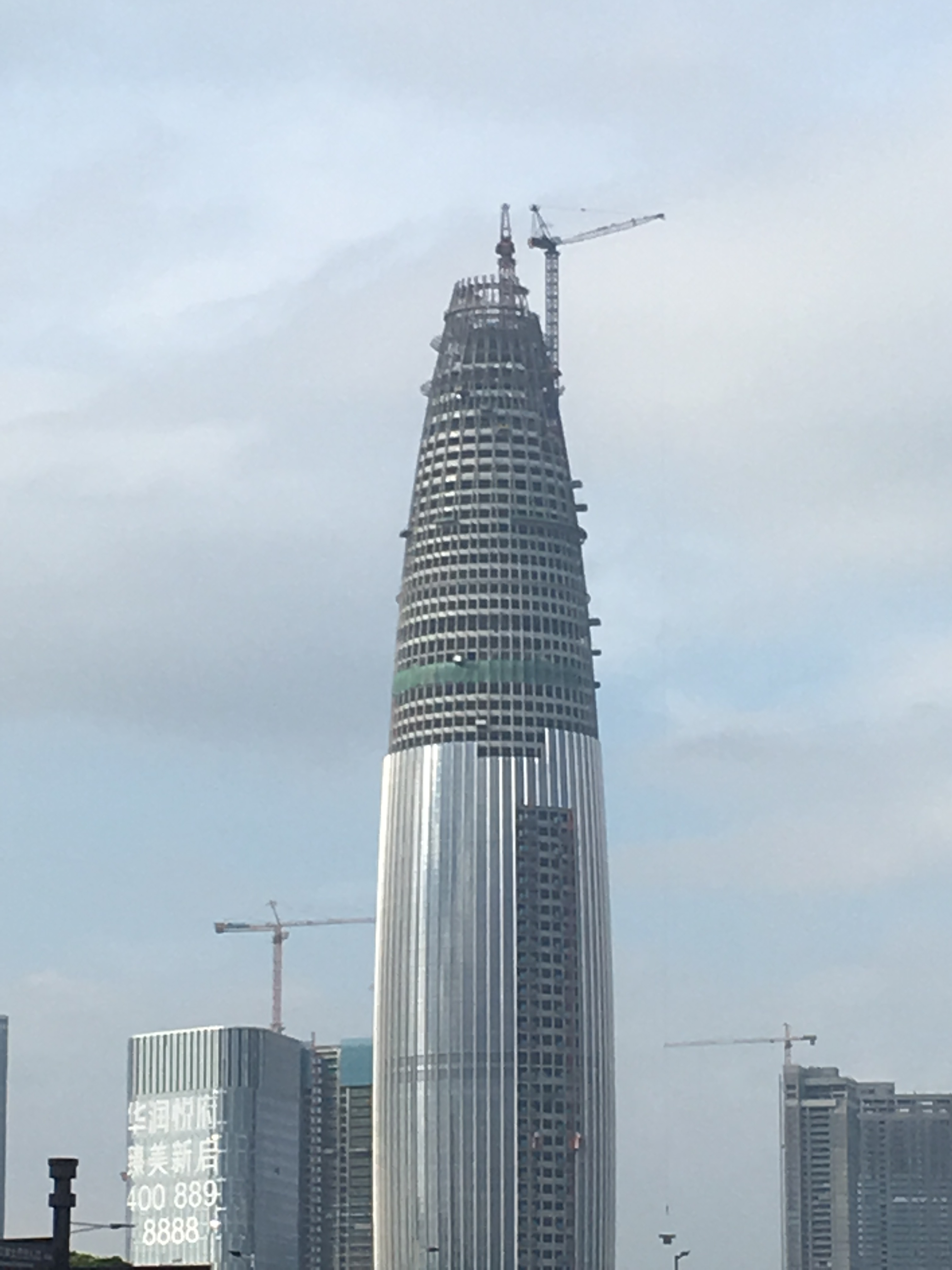
China Resources Headquarters in November 2016

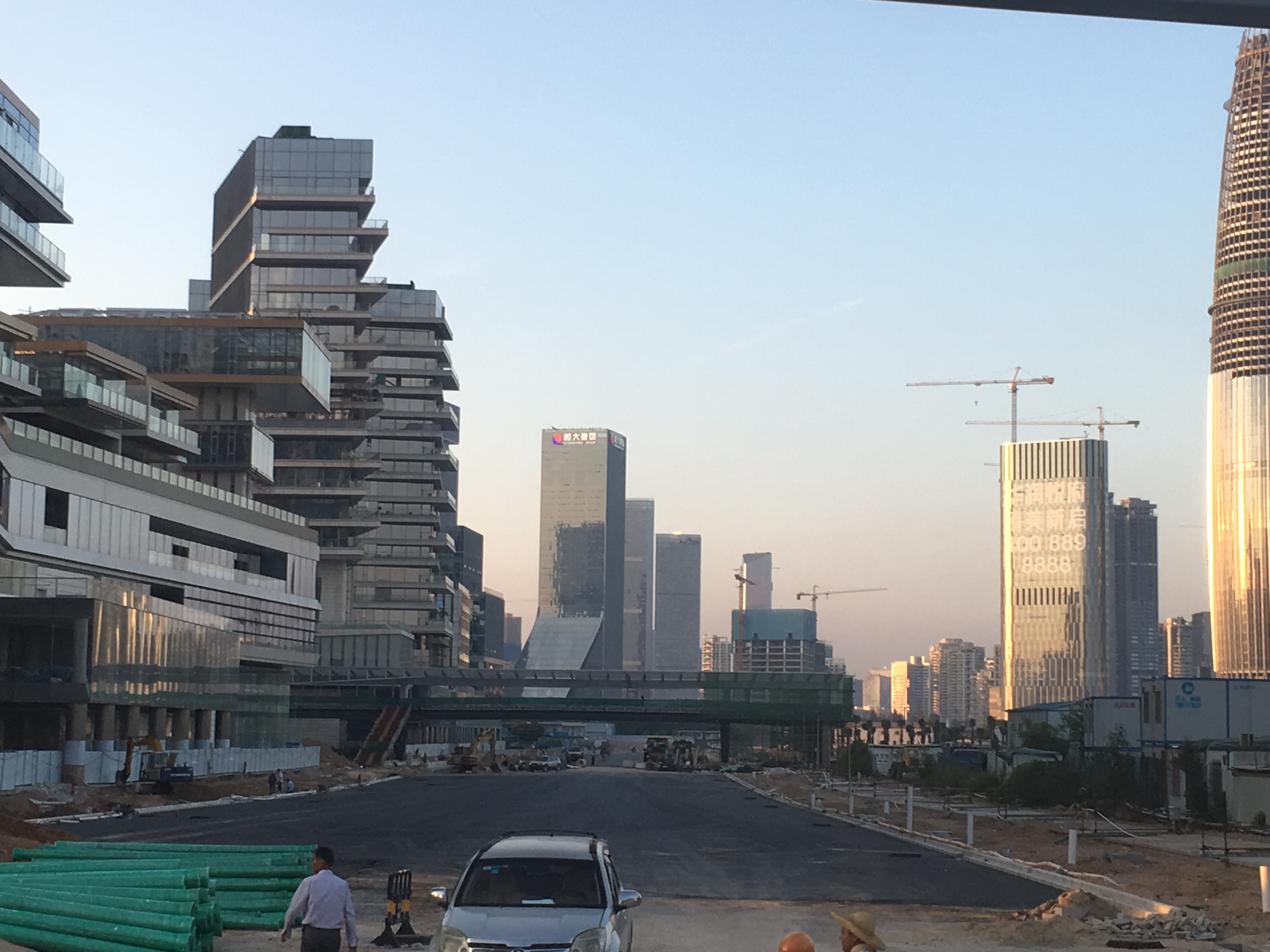
China Resources Headquarters (right) with the One Shenzhen Bay development (left)

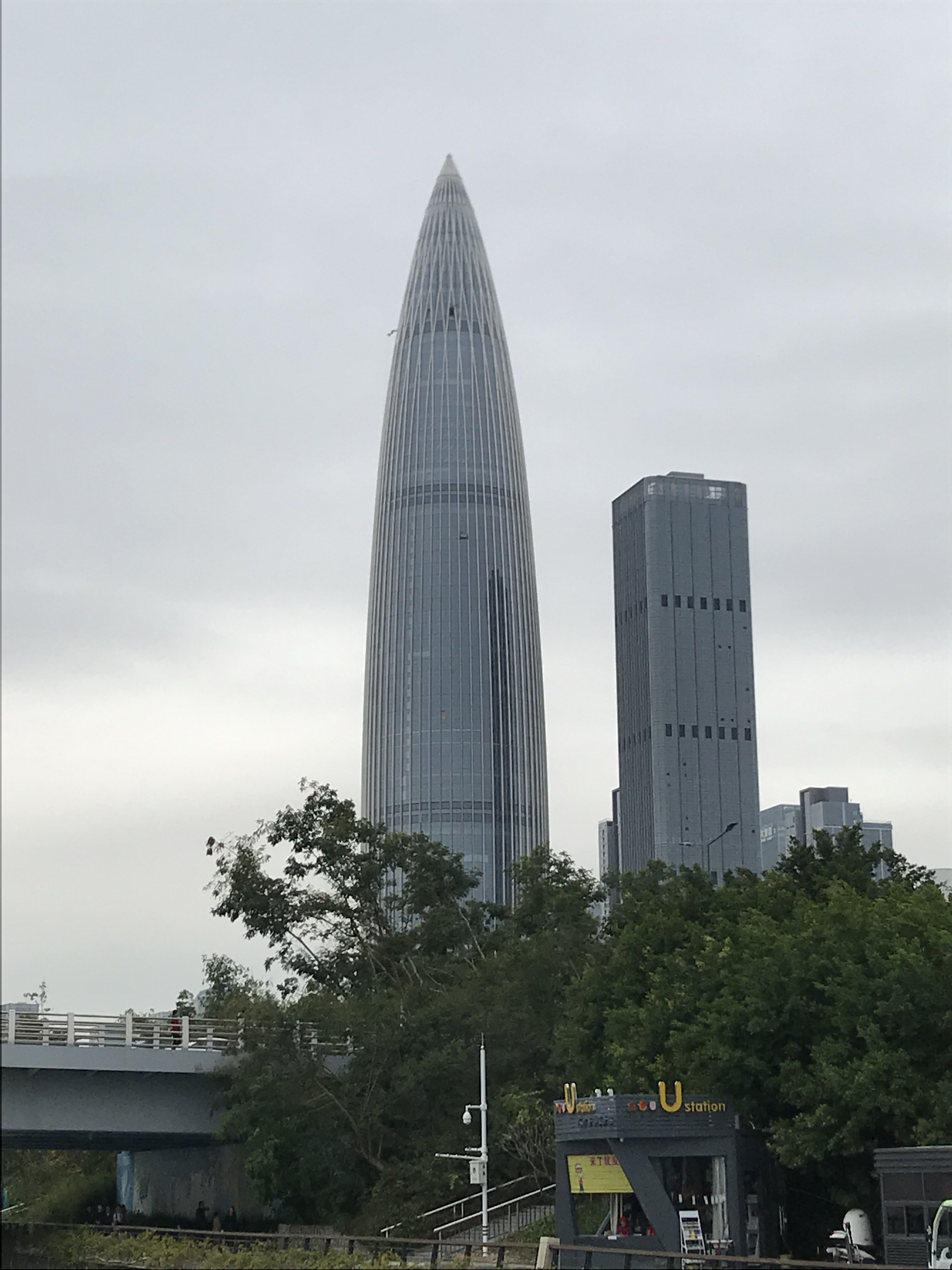
China Resources Headquarters in Shenzhen

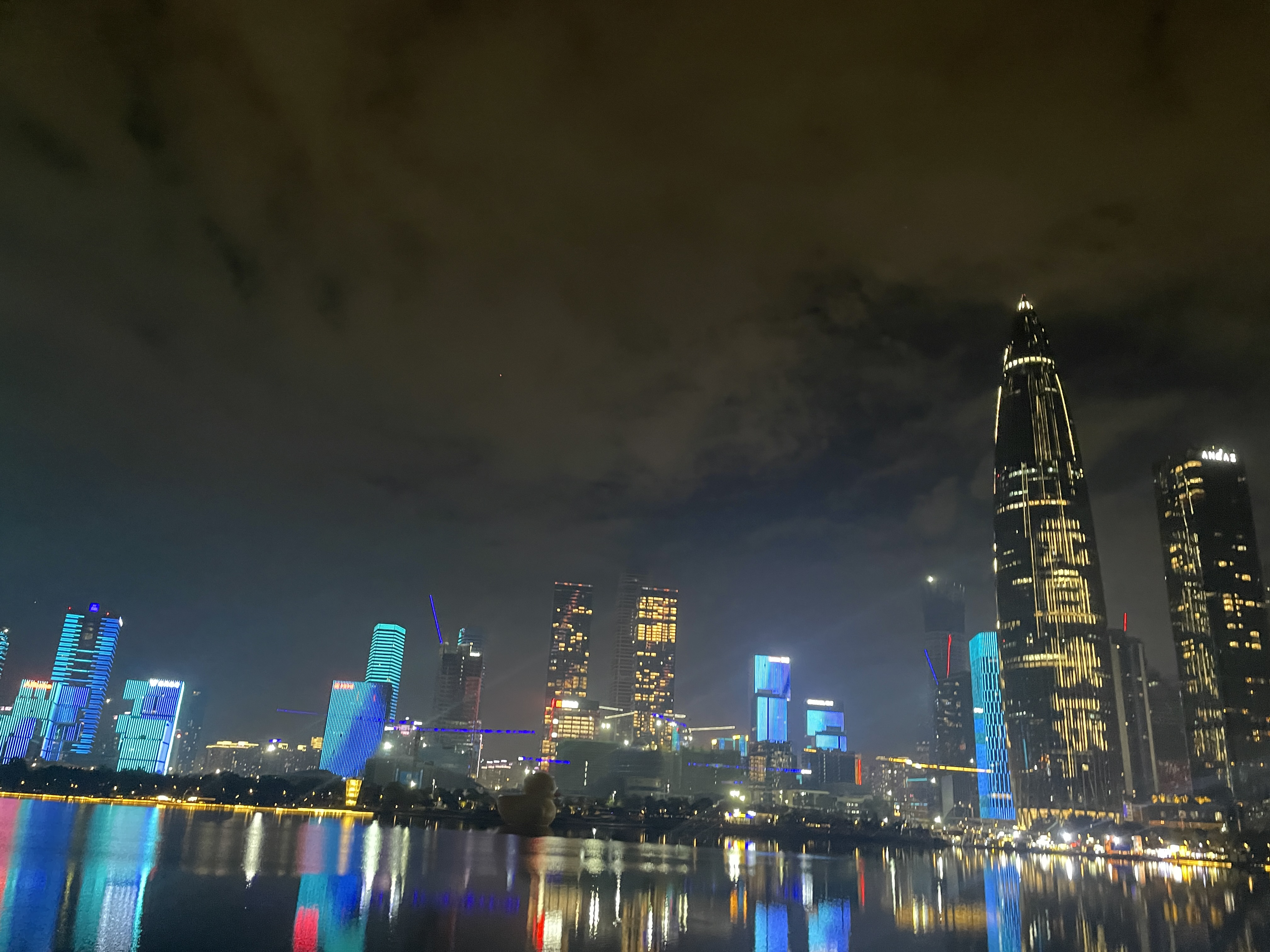
Night view of China Resources Headquarters

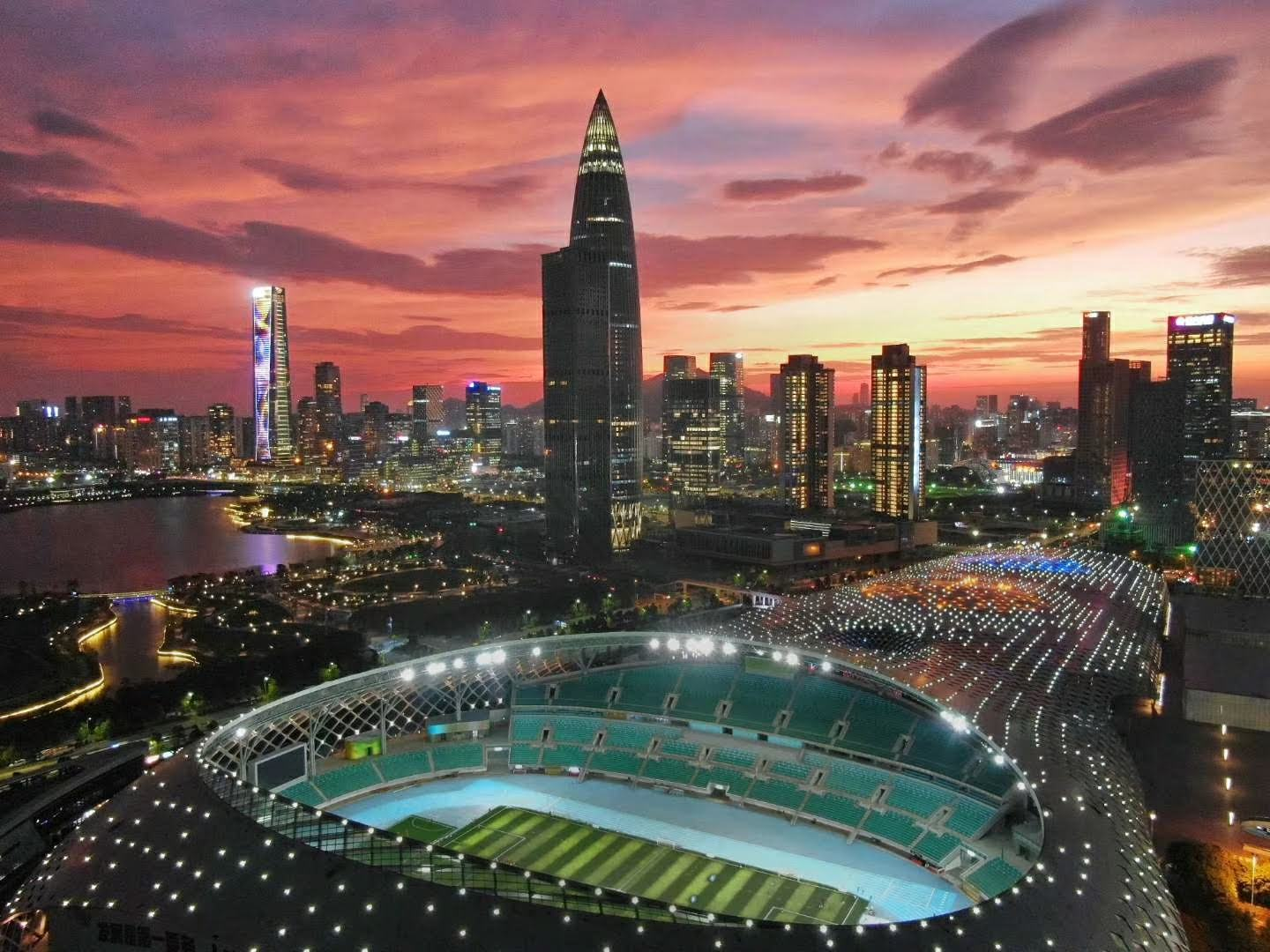
China Resources Headquarters with the Shenzhen Bay Sports Center

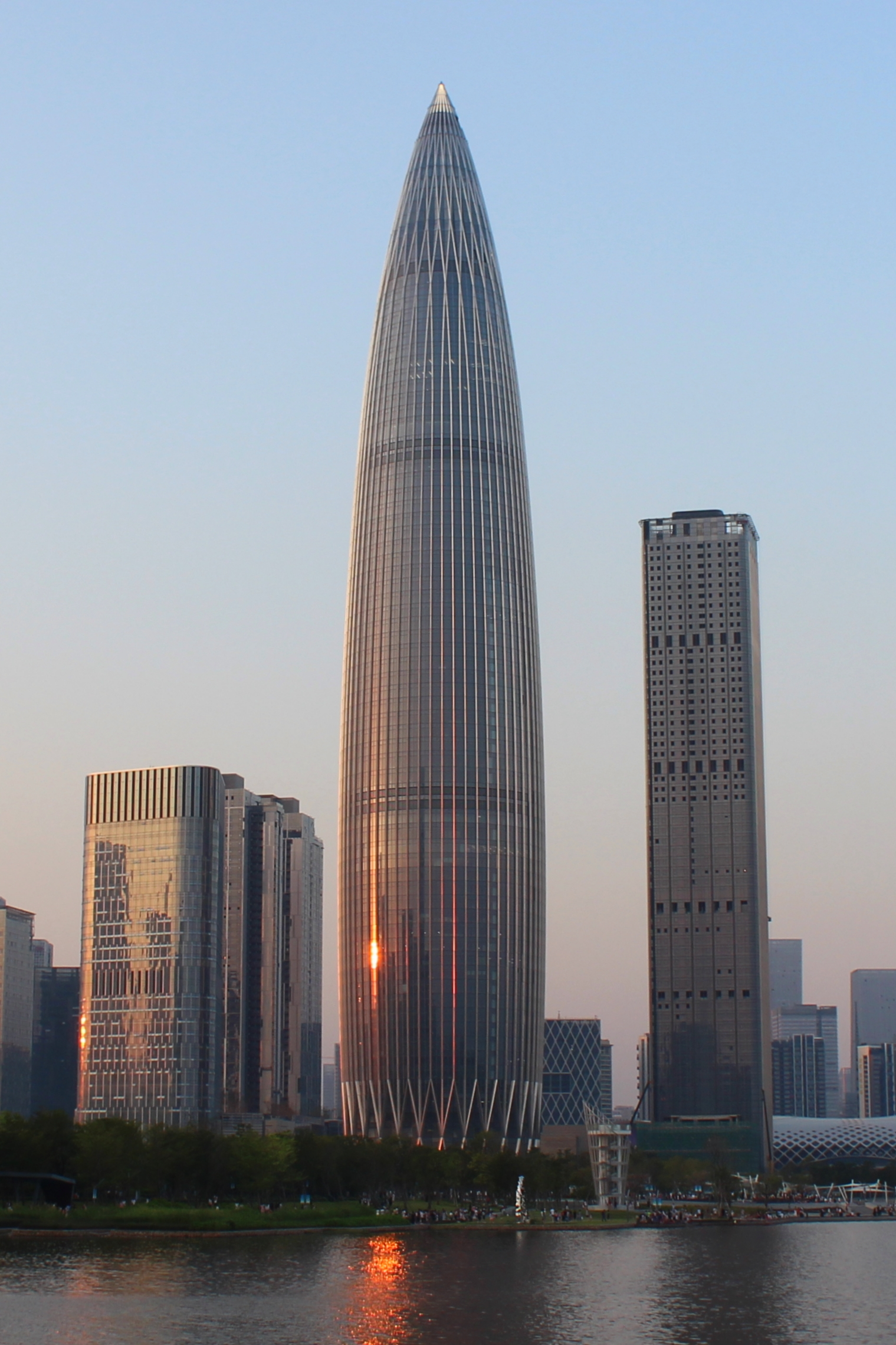
China Resources Headquarters in Shenzhen in October 2018

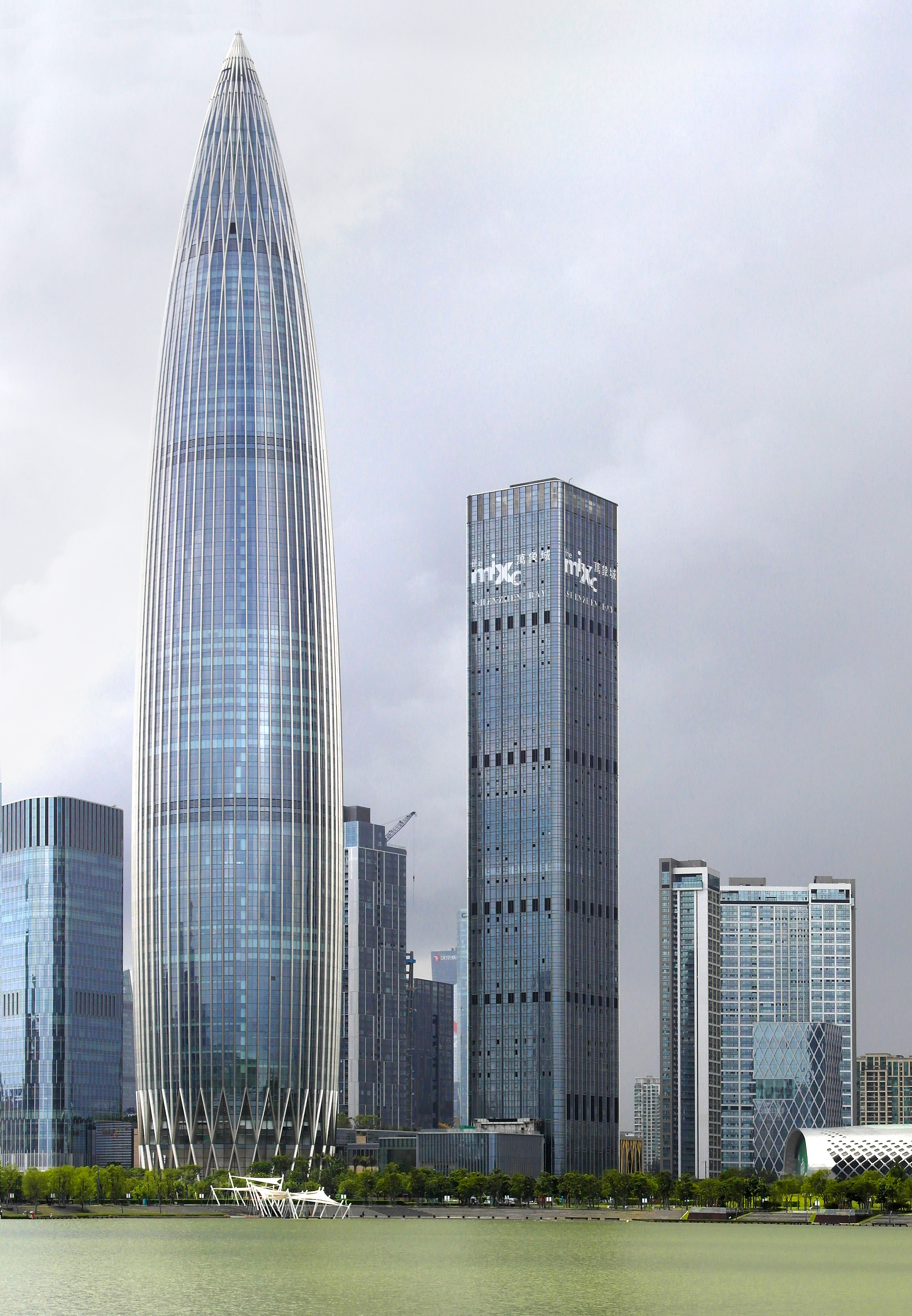
China Resources Headquarters in Shenzhen in July 2019

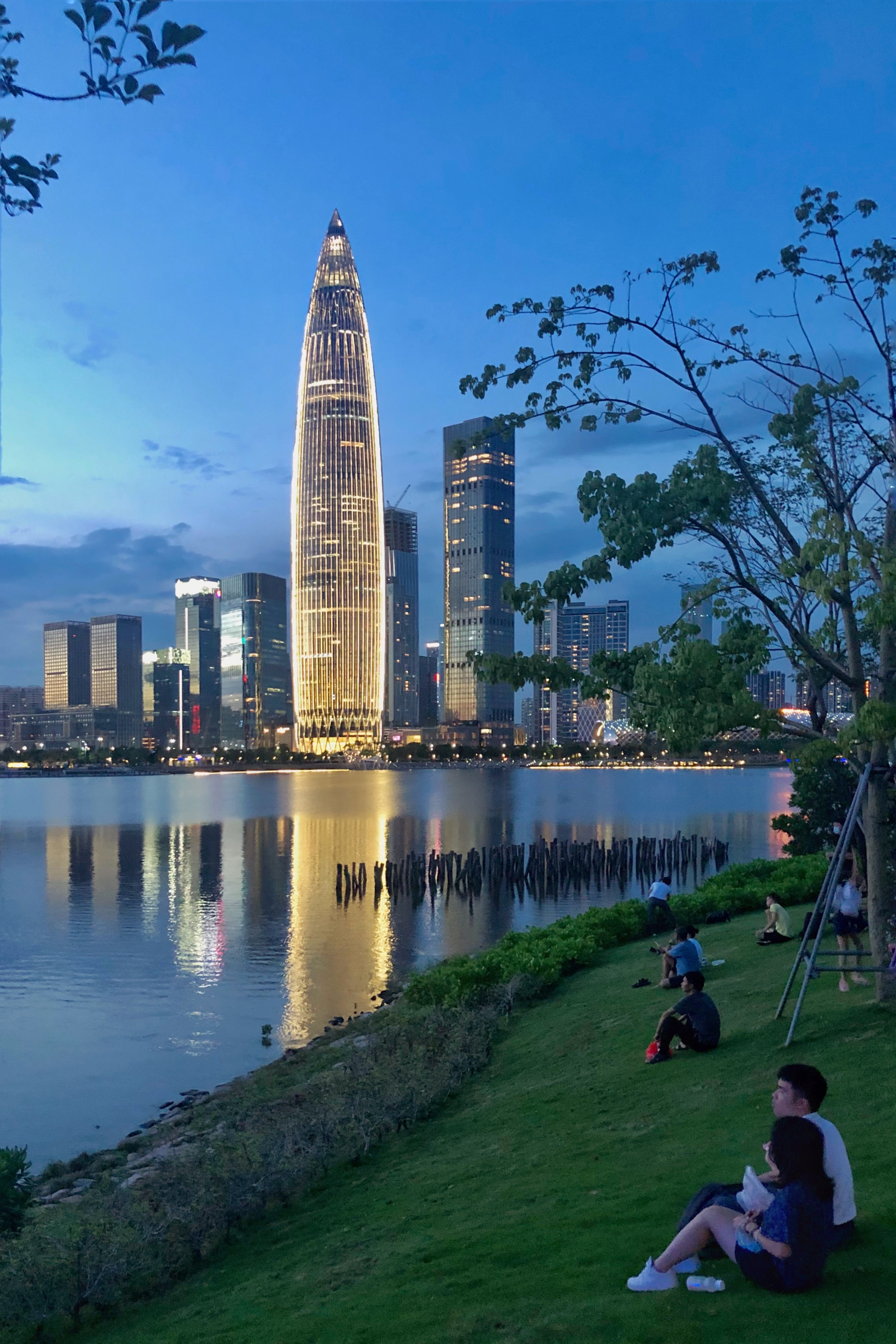
China Resources Headquarters view from the Talent Park, Shenzhen

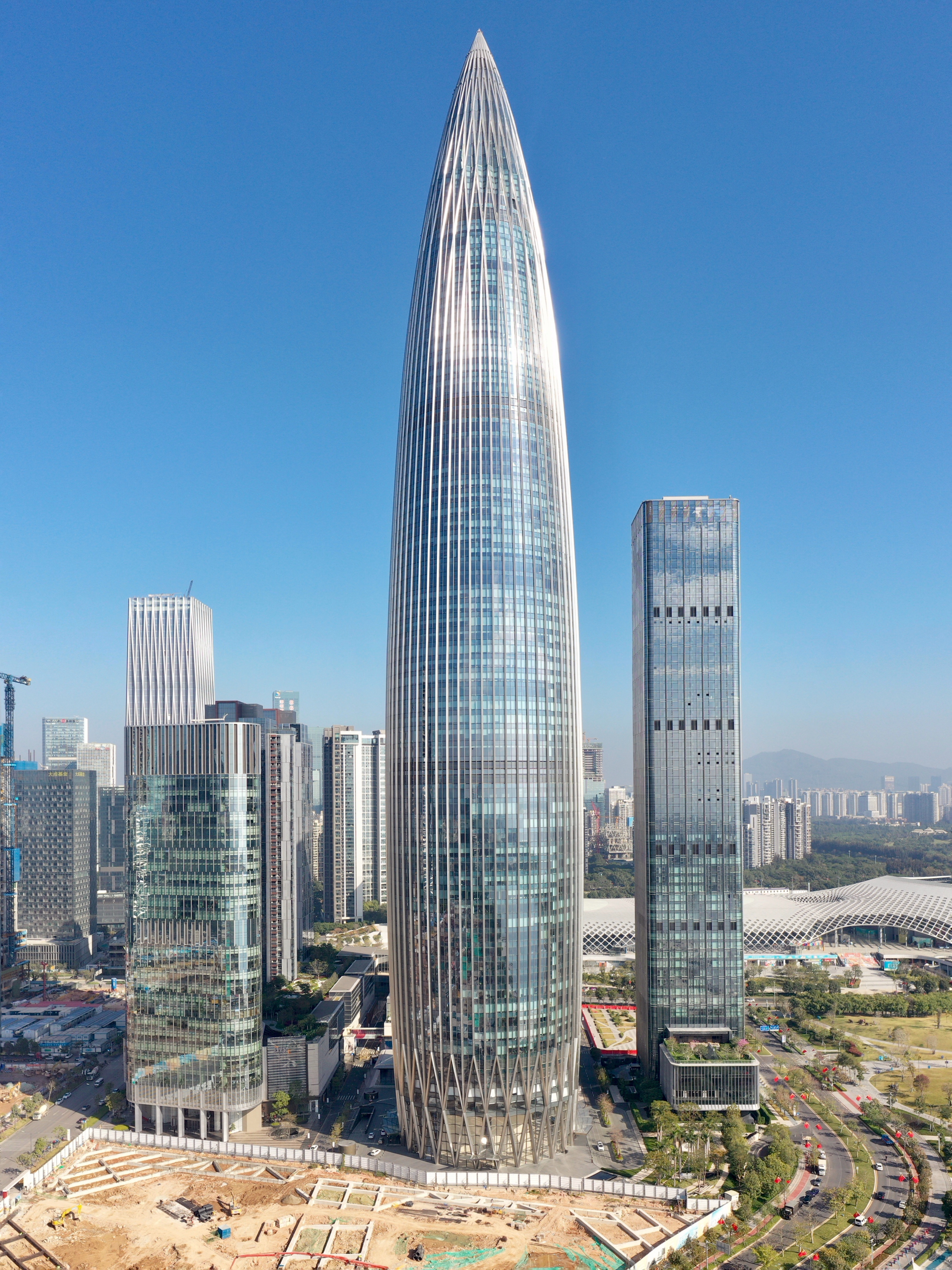
China Resources Headquarters in Shenzhen in December 2020

== See also ==
- One Shenzhen Bay
- Andaz Shenzhen Bay
- List of tallest buildings in Shenzhen
- List of tallest buildings in China
- List of tallest buildings in the world
