= Song Lin =

Chinese business executive

- 宋林
- Born: February 3, 1963 (age 63); Jinan, Shandong, China
- Education: Tongji University
- Occupations: Chairman, China Resources (2008–2014); Chairman, China Resources Shenzhen International Trust (2008–2014)
- Years active: 1985–2014
- Political party: Chinese Communist Party (expelled in 2015)
- Children: 1

"Charley" Song Lin (Chinese: 宋林; pinyin: Sòng Lín; born February 3, 1963) is a former Chinese business executive. At the pinnacle of his career, he served as the board chairman and Chinese Communist Party Committee Secretary of China Resources, a state-owned conglomerate with interests in the beverages, consumer goods, and food industries. He was also the chairman of China Resources Shenzhen International Trust, and Harvest Capital Partners, an asset management and investment subsidiary of China Resources.

Song spent 30 years in state-owned China Resources. In 2012, Song was listed as one of the "50 Most Influential Business Leaders" by Fortune. He was a member of the National Committee of Chinese People's Political Consultative Conference. In 2014, he came under investigation for corruption and was dismissed from his positions.

== Career ==
Song was born and raised in Jinan, Shandong. His ancestral home is in Rushan, now under the jurisdiction of the City of Weihai. His grandfather was a local official after the founding of People's Republic, he had four sons, Song Jiqing (宋吉清), Song Jibin (宋吉彬), and Song Jibo (宋吉波), his second son died young. His father, Song Jiqing, was born in 1929 and joined the Young Pioneers of China at the age of 14. He took part in the Chinese Communist Revolution at age 18. After graduating from Wendeng Normal College, he became a teacher and taught in Jinan. He died there in 2002.

Song graduated from Tongji University, majoring in applied mechanics.

Beginning in 1985, he served in several posts in China Resources, including senior manager, assistant general manager, deputy general manager, and manager. In 2004, Song, at age 41, became the general manager (chief executive) of China Resources, then he became chairman of the board in May 2008. He also served as the chairman of China Resources Power and China Resources Microelectronics Limited, vice-chairman of China Vanke Co., Ltd, and non-executive director of Zhejiang Geely Holding Group Co., Ltd.

== Downfall ==
On April 15, 2014, Wang Wenzhi, a reporter at Economic Information (经济参考报) wrote to the Central Commission for Discipline Inspection (CCDI), the Chinese Communist Party's central anti-corruption body, accusing Song Lin of maintaining a mistress and money laundering through his mistress. On April 17, 2014, the CCDI issued a notice that it was investigating Song for "serious violations of laws and regulations". On April 19, 2014, he was dismissed from his posts by the Chinese government.

After investigation by the CCDI, Song Lin was expelled from the Chinese Communist Party on September 11, 2015. He was accused by the anti-graft agency of violating "political rules and organizational discipline", using his position to secure promotions and business interests for others, taking bribes, using public funds to cover personal expenses, took on other part-time positions, using public funds to play golf, embezzled public funds, and "committed adultery". He was indicted on criminal charges of bribery and embezzlement.

Chinese media reported that Song had close relations with two politicians: former CCP Politburo Standing Committee members Zeng Qinghong and He Guoqiang.

On June 1, 2017, Song was sentenced to 14 years in prison, for taking some 23.32 million yuan (~$3.43 million) in bribes and plundering the public treasury worth 9.74 million yuan (~$1.43 million).

== Personal life ==
Song's wife and child have emigrated to the United States.

Song's uncle, Song Jibin, is a farmer in a village in Rushan, Shandong province. Song reportedly visits his ancentral home every two years to pay respects to his deceased father.
