= Guosen Securities =

Chinese Securities Brokerage

- Type: Public
- Traded as: SZSE: 002736
- Industry: Investment company
- Founded: 1989; 37 years ago
- Headquarters: Shenzhen, China
- Area served: China
- Key people: He Ru (chairman)
- Products: Brokerage, Asset Management, Investment Banking, Private Equity, investment management
- Revenue: RMB 7.8 billion (2010)
- Net income: RMB 3.1 billion (2010)
- Owners: Central People's Government
- Number of employees: 11,500
- Subsidiaries: Penghua Fund Management
- Website: www.guosen.com.cn

Guosen Securities Company Limited ("Guosen Securities", "GSEC" or Chinese: 国信证券) is a Chinese state-owned financial services company headquartered in Shenzhen, China, with more than 70 branches and 11,500 employees nationwide. It has offices in 47 major cities in China including Shenzhen, Beijing, Guangzhou, Foshan, Nanjing, Shanghai, Tianjin and Hong Kong. Guosen Securities provides sales and trading, investment banking, research, asset management, private equity, and other financial services with both institutional and retail clients in China and Hong Kong. It also operates a trading platform called GuoXin TradingStation.

The company's heritage can be traced back to 1989, when it was originated from the Shenzhen International Trust and Investment Securities Business Division. In 1996, it became an independent corporation and was renamed as Guosen Securities. As of 2011, 40% of its shares are held by Shenzhen International Holdings as the major shareholder, an investment holding institution jointly owned by Shenzhen provincial government and Cheung Kong Holdings.

In 2011, Guosen Securities gained the second largest market share of 8.8 percent in domestic equity offerings and the 18th market share of 0.9 percent in global equity offerings.

== History ==
1989 – Guosen Securities was originated from the Shenzhen International Trust and Investment Securities Business Division ("SITIS Business Division"), which was one of the three earliest securities business divisions in China's securities market.

Early 1990s – SITIS Business Division accounted for more than 30 percent of the total trading volume of the Shenzhen Stock Exchange.

1994 – Shenzhen International Trust and Investment Securities Company Limited ("SITIS Company") was officially established with registered capital of RMB 100 million. In spite of a two-year bearish market in China, the company still operated without suffering losses.

1996 – As Shenzhen government aimed to stimulate local securities market, SITIS Company underwent a restructuring and was renamed as Guosen Securities.

1997-1999 – Guosen Securities' registered capital was raised to RMB 2 billion after twice capital injections from shareholders in 1997 and 1999.

1998 – A joint-venture investment manager, Penghua Fund Management Company Limited, was founded with assets under management of RMB 104 billion as of June 2011. Guosen Securities as the largest shareholder holds 50% of shares.

2008 – Guosen Securities was restructured as a stock limited company, with an increase of registered capital to RMB 7 billion. A wholly owned subsidiary Guosen Securities (HK) Financial Holdings Company Limited was established in Hong Kong with registered capital of HKD 700 million, which serves as a platform for Guosen Securities' business internationalization.

2012 – Guosen Securities is scheduling an initial public offering in Shenzhen A-share market, with estimated proceeds of RMB 20 to 30 billion.

2019 - The Hong Kong Securities and Futures Commission (SFC) has reprimanded Guosen Securities (HK) Brokerage Company, Limited (Guosen) and fined it $15.2 million for failures in complying with anti-money laundering (AML) and counter-terrorist financing (CFT) regulatory requirements when handling third party fund deposits. The SFC's investigation revealed that between November 2014 and December 2015, Guosen had processed 10,000 third party deposits totalling approximately $5 billion for more than 3,500 clients.

== Structure ==
The company is organized into five major business arms: sales and trading, investment banking, research, asset management, and private equity.

=== Sales and Trading ===
Sales and trading comprises equities, fixed income, currencies and commodities, serving both institutional and retail clients. With 70 branches covering 47 major cities in China, Guosen was ranked top three in terms of trading volume in 2008–10, and accounted for 4.34% of market share in 2011.

=== Investment Banking ===
Investment Banking provides a variety of advisory and underwriting services, ranging from equity and debt offerings, pre-IPO financing, merger and acquisition, restructuring and privatisation advisory, compliance advisory, and structured financing. The investment banking arm owns a total of 144 sponsor representatives, which is the largest among investment banks in China.

Between 2006 and 2009, Guosen Securities was ranked the first in total number of initial public offerings in A-share market for four consecutive years. In 2011, Guosen Securities gained the second largest market share of 8.8 percent in domestic equity offerings and the 18th market share of 0.9 percent in global equity offerings.

=== Asset Management ===
Asset Management offers a wide range of investment products in equities, fixed income, fund of funds, and direct financing, in order to meet clients' diversified requirements and goals. Guosen's asset management arm is also the first company to offer equity division advisory services among Chinese rivals. In Hong Kong, the AM team provides both traditional and alternative investment products. The traditional funds mainly focus on offshore public/private funds in equities, fixed income, balanced portfolios, as well as QFII investments. Whereas the alternative investment products offered include hedge funds, fund of funds, commodity exchange funds, private equity and red wine funds, etc.

=== Private Equity ===
Guosen H&S Investment Company Limited Guosen H&S Investment Company Limited is a wholly subsidy of Guosen Securities with registered capital of RMB 1 billion, specializing in direct private equity investment. Guosen Securities is the third securities firm that is approved to carry out direct investment business in China.

== Ownership Structure ==
Guosen Securities' current chairman is He Ru. The company currently has 5 major shareholders, shareholding structure as follow:

Shareholders	Holdings %
Shenzhen International Holdings	40
China Resources Shenzhen International Trust	30
Yunnan Hongta Group	20
FAW Group	5.1
Beijing Urban Construction Investment Development	4.9

== See also ==
- Securities industry in China
