= Andrea Beltratti =

Italian professor and economist

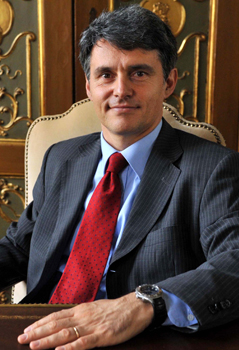
- Born: February 9, 1959 (age 67); Turin, Italy
- Education: University of Turin; University of Pavia; Yale University
- Title: Professor at the Bocconi University; Chairman at Eurizon Capital

Andrea Beltratti (born February 9, 1959, Turin, Italy) is professor at Bocconi University, director of the Executive Master in Finance - EMF at SDA Bocconi School of Management and Chairman of Eurizon Capital. He has been Chairman of the Management Board of Intesa Sanpaolo until May 2013.

== Biography ==
He earned his undergraduate degree in Economics from Università degli Studi of Turin in 1982 and his PhD in Economics from Yale University in 1989 with a dissertation on stock price volatility. After being a Lecturer in Economics at the University of Turin, he has become associate Professor at Bocconi University in 1998 and then Full Professor in 2000.

During the 1990s, he studied economic growth and sustainable development. In his studies, where he analyzed some of the principles of political philosophy stated by John Rawls, Beltratti addressed the postulate that an economy is sustainable when it does not compromise future generations' wealth. Meanwhile, he collaborated with the Fondazione ENI Enrico Mattei and joining research groups at ISTAT, Società Italiana degli Economisti, Intergovernmental Panel on Climate Change (IPCC) and Stanford Institute of Theoretical Economics.

In 1997-2008 he was Scientific Director of the BSI-Gamma Foundation. In 2012 he worked with Intesa Sanpaolo to found the Savings Museum in Turin and became President of Patti Chiari, the unit of the Associazione Bancaria Italiana, which deals with financial education.

== Academic career ==
In 1998 he was Scientific Coordinator of the Master in Finance offered by the University of Turin. In 2000-2004 he was appointed Director of the degree in Economics and Social Sciences at Bocconi University. In 2006-2008 he was member of the Committee that assigns the Marco Fanno scholarships.

== Financial markets ==
He is one of the early researchers to study the comovement of the bond and stock markets in two papers, which were published in the early 1990s with Robert Shiller, his advisor at Yale. During the 2000s he has studied the impact of corporate governance on stock market prices, highlighting its role, together with regulation and business models, in determining the behavior of the stock market during the 2008 credit crisis.

== Publications ==
- The value relevance and timeliness of write-downs during the financial crisis of 2007-2009, International Journal of Accounting, forthcoming, 2014 (with N. Spear and M. Szabo);
- Is M&A different during a financial crisis? Evidence from the European banking sector, Journal of Banking and Finance, 2013 (with G. Paladino);
- The credit crisis around the globe: Why did some banks perform better?, Journal of Financial Economics, 2012, 105, 1-17, Lead article, with R. Stulz (also NBER working paper n. 15180);
- The stock market reaction to the 2005 split share structure reform in China, Pacific Basin Finance Journal, 2012, 20, 543-560, with B. Bortolotti and M. Caccavaio (also European Central Bank working paper series no. 1339, ECB, Frankfurt)
- Potential drawbacks of price based accounting: I. the insurance sector, Geneva Papers, 2007,32,163-177 (with G. Corvino);
- A Portfolio based evaluation of affine term structure models, Annals of Operations Research, 2007, Annals of Operation
- Breaks and persistency: macroeconomic causes of stock market volatility, in Journal of Econometrics, 2006, 131, 151-177 8 (with Claudio Morana);
- Statistical benefits of value-at-risk with long memory, in Journal of Risk, 2005, 7, 47-73 (with Claudio Morana);
- "Structural change and long run dependence in volatility of exchange rates: either, neither or both?", in Journal of Empirical Finance, 2004 8 (with Claudio Morana), 11, 629-658;
- Scenario modeling for selective hedging strategies, in Journal of Economic Dynamics and Control, 2004 (with A. Laurent e S. Zenios, 28, 955-974);
- Scenario modeling for the management of international bond portfolios, annals of Operations Research, 1998, 85, 227-247 (with A. Consiglio e S. Zenios);
- The Equity Premium is no Puzzle, in Endogenous Economic Fluctuations, edited by M. Kurz, Springer, 1996 (with M. Kurz)
- Models of Economic Growth with Environmental Assets, Kluwer Academic Publishers, 1996;
- Artificial neural networks for Economic and Financial Modelling, 1996, International Thompson Publisher, London (with S. Margarita and P. Terna);
- The green golden rule, Economics Letters, 1995, 49, 175-179 (with G. Chichilnisky and G. Heal);
- Actual and warranted relations between asset prices, in Oxford Economic Papers, vol.45,1993,387-402 (with Robert Shiller);
- Stock prices and bond yields: can their comovements be explained in terms of present value models?, in Journal of Monetary Economics, vol. 30, 1992, pp. 25–46(with Robert Schiller);
- U.S. military expenditure and the dollar, in Economic Inquiry, vol. 27, ottobre 1989, 1-7 8 (with Vittorio Grilli);
