= China Resources Mixc Lifestyle =

Chinese real estate company

China Resources Mixc Lifestyle Services Limited
- Trade name: CR Mixc Lifestyle
- Native name: 华润万象生活有限公司
- Company type: Public subsidiary
- Traded as: SEHK: 1209; Hang Seng Index component
- Industry: Real estate
- Founded: 1994; 32 years ago
- Headquarters: Shenzhen, Guangdong, China
- Key people: Li Xin (chairman); Yu Linkang (president)
- Revenue: ▲CN¥14.77 billion (2023)
- Net income: ▲CN¥3.91 billion (2023)
- Total assets: ▲CN¥27.78 billion (2023)
- Total equity: ▲CN¥16.04 billion (2023)
- Number of employees: 40,977 (2023)
- Parent: China Resources Land
- Website: www.crmixclifestyle.com.cn

China Resources Mixc Lifestyle Services (CR Mixc Lifestyle; Chinese: 华润万象生活; pinyin: Huárùn Wànxiàng Shēnghuó) is a publicly listed Chinese property management and commercial operational services provider in China.

It is a subsidiary of China Resources Land (CR Land) which it used to be part of until it was spun off in 2020.

The company is known for operating the Mixc brand of luxury shopping malls in China.

== Background ==
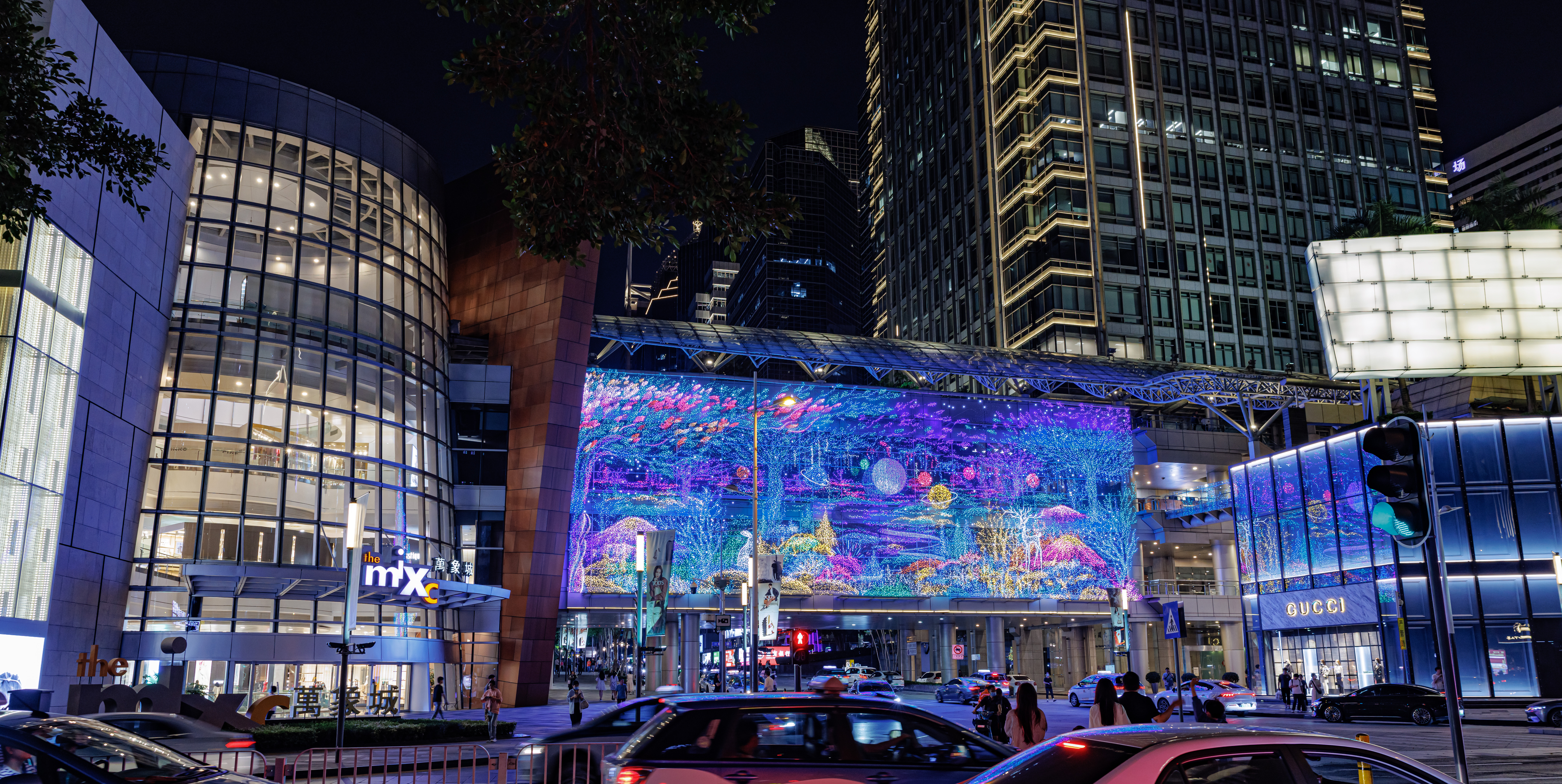
Shenzhen Mixc mall

CR Mixc Lifestyle's origins can be traced back to 1994 when China Resources invested into Beijing Huayuan Real Estate Company Limited. It then started its property management business which focused on residential property management services. Later on the company reorganized into CR Land.

In 2000, the Shenzhen Mixc mall commenced construction and opened in 2004 as the first under the "Mixc" brand. The "Mixc" brand was developed for commercial operational services.

In 2005, CR Land acquired certain properties from China Resources which allowed CR Land to commence its property management services for office buildings.

In 2017, CR Mixc Lifestyle was incorporated as a company which would contain CR Land's property management and commercial business.

On 9 December 2020, CR Land spun out CR Mixc Lifestyle as a separate entity and held its initial public offering on the Hong Kong Stock Exchange to become a listed company. The offering raised US$1.6 billion.

In December 2022, CR Mixc Lifestyle became a member of the Hang Seng Index.

== See also ==
- China Resources
- China Resources Land
