= China Resources Cement =

Chinese cement and concrete producer

China Resources Cement Holdings Limited 华潤水泥控股有限公司
- Type: State-owned enterprise (Red chip)
- Industry: Building materials
- Founded: 2003; 23 years ago
- Headquarters: Hong Kong, China
- Area served: China
- Key people: Miss Zhou Junqing (chairman)
- Products: Cement and concrete
- Parent: China Resources
- Website: www.crcement.com.hk/simp/

China Resources Cement Holdings Limited (CRC), parented by China Resources, is a leading cement and concrete producer in Southern China. It is the largest NSP clinker and cement producer in Southern China by production capacity and the second largest concrete producer in China by sales volume. It was established in 2003 and incorporated in the Cayman Islands.

== Listing ==
China Resources Cement has been listed twice. It was first listed on the Hong Kong Stock Exchange in 2003 with an IPO price of HK$2.32 per share. In 2006, it was privatized by its largest shareholder, China Resources (Holdings), with an acquired price of HK$2.45 per share. In 2009, CRC was relisted with an IPO price of HK$3.9 per share. However, its share price is still below its offer price after listing.
