= China Resources Alcohol Corporation =

Second largest ethanol producer in China

China Resources Alcohol Corporation (CRAC) is the second largest ethanol producer in China and the owner of the only cellulosic ethanol pilot demonstration plant in the world which operates continuously, 24-hours per day. SunOpta BioProcess Group provided the necessary systems and technology to CRAC in September 2006 and the plant began production of ethanol from local corn stover (stalks and leaves) in October 2006.

CRAC's goal is to install 5,000 tonnes per year (1.7 Million US gallons per year) of cellulosic ethanol capacity by the end of 2007 and 1,000,000 tonnes per year (330 Million US gallons per year) by 2012.

== See also ==
- Biofuel
- Cellulosic ethanol commercialization
- Renewable energy commercialization
