= China Resources Gas =

China Resources Gas 华润燃气
- Type: State-owned enterprise (Red chip)
- Industry: Gas distribution
- Headquarters: Hong Kong, People's Republic of China
- Area served: People's Republic of China
- Key people: Chairman:
- Parent: China Resources
- Website: China Resources Gas Group Limited

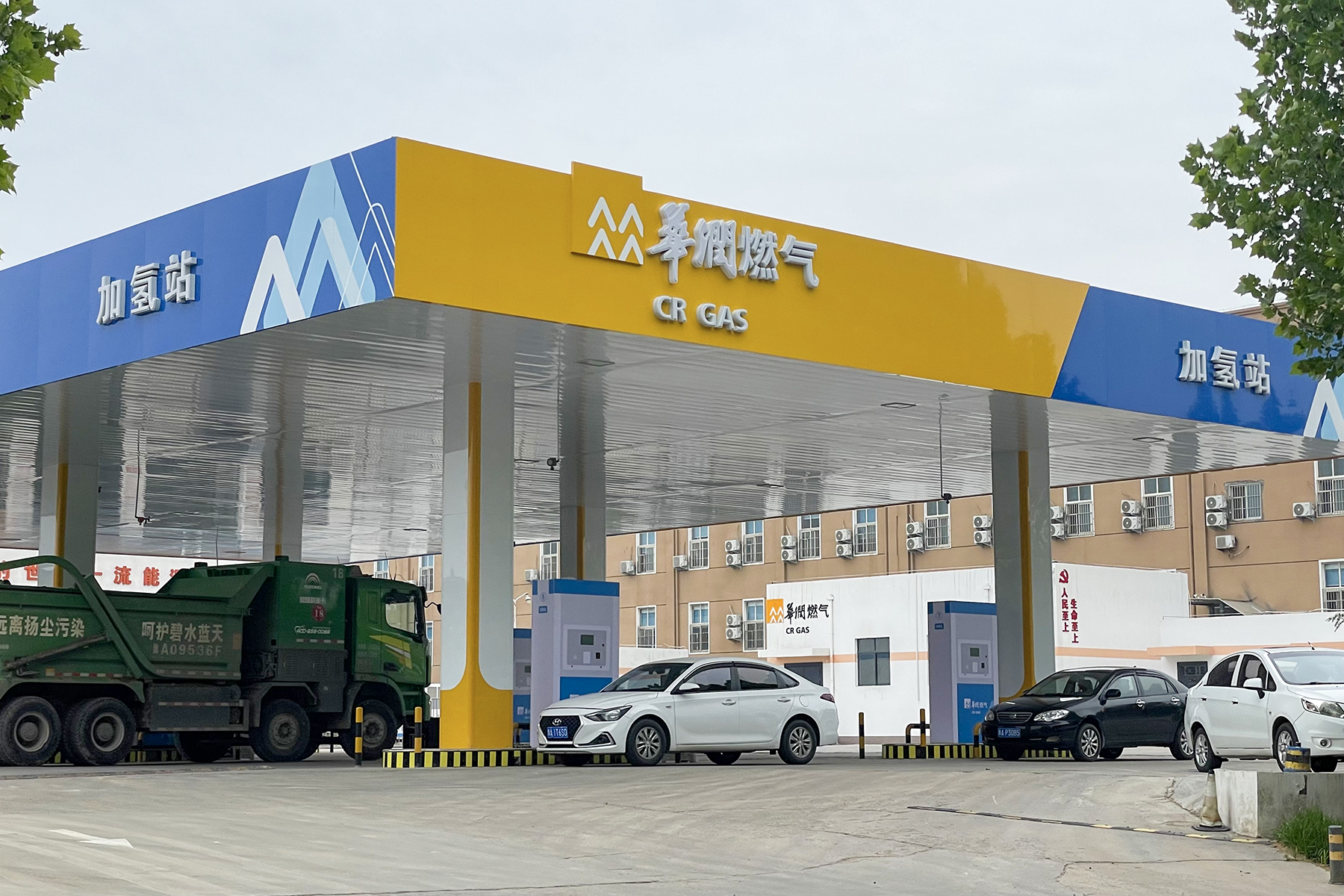
Hydrogen station of CR Gas in Zhengzhou

China Resources Gas Group Limited (SEHK: 1193), or China Resources Gas, was incorporated and registered in Hong Kong in 1994, but previous businesses disposed of by 2009 to be developed as a city gas distribution business.

It is a subsidiary of China Resources Holdings, a conglomerate in mainland China and Hong Kong.
