= China Resources Power =

China Resources Power Holdings Company Limited
- Type: Public
- Traded as: SEHK: 836
- Industry: Power Generation
- Founded: 2001; 25 years ago
- Headquarters: Wan Chai, Hong Kong
- Area served: China
- Key people: Song Lin (chairman)
- Parent: China Resources
- Website: www.cr-power.com/en/

China Resources Power Holdings Company Limited (commonly known as CR Power, Chinese: 华润电力) was incorporated and registered in Hong Kong in 2001. It is a subsidiary of China Resources Holdings, a conglomerate in Mainland China and Hong Kong. Its business is concerned about the investment, development, operation and management of coal-burning power plants in the regions including Beijing, Hebei, Henan, Liaoning, Shandong, Jiangsu, Anhui, Zhejiang, Hubei, Hunan, Guangdong and Yunnan.

China Resources Power was added to be Hang Seng Index Constituent Stock on 8 June 2009 to replace Yue Yuen Industrial.
