= One Shenzhen Bay =

Skyscraper complex in Shenzhen, Guangdong, China

- 深圳湾一号
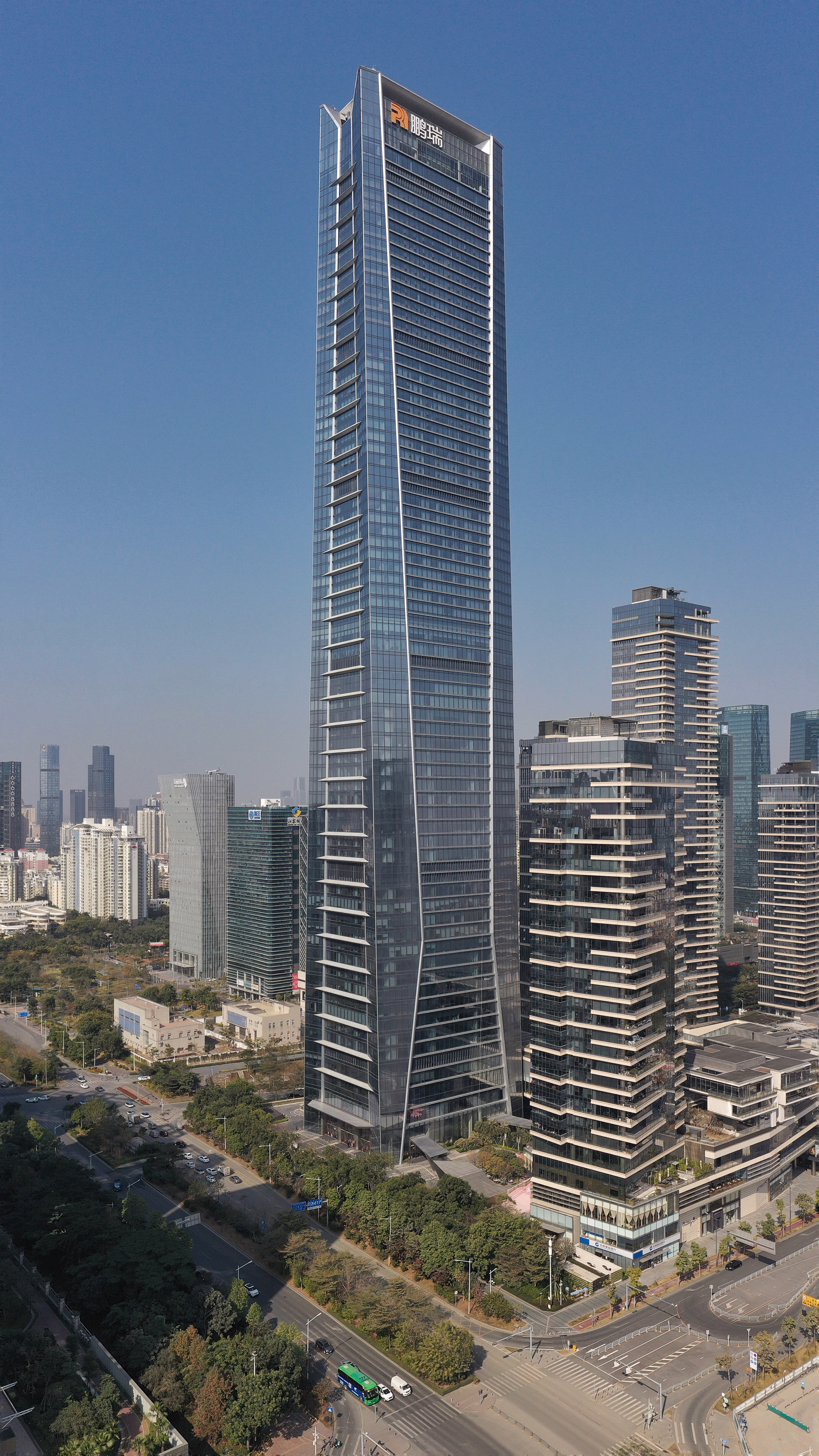
- One Shenzhen Bay Tower 7 in January 2021

General information
- Status: Completed
- Type: Hotel / Office / Residential
- Location: 3008 Keyuan South Road, Nanshan District, Shenzhen, Guangdong, China
- Coordinates: 22°30′31″N 113°56′14″E
- Construction started: August 4, 2014
- Completed: March 11, 2018

Height
- Architectural: T7. 341.4 m (1,120 ft); T5. 196 m (643 ft); T6. 136 m (446 ft); T8. 125.4 m (411 ft); T2. 125.4 m (411 ft); T1. 104.4 m (343 ft); T4. 84.5 m (277 ft); T3. 75.6 m (248 ft)
- Tip: T7. 341.4 m (1,120 ft)
- Top floor: T7. 319.7 m (1,049 ft)

Technical details
- Floor count: T7. 74; T5. 51; T6. 35; T8. 29; T2. 32; T1. 21; T4. 18; T3. 18
- Floor area: 358,000 square metres (3,853,480 sq ft)

Design and construction
- Architect: Kohn Pedersen Fox
- Developer: Parkland Group
- Main contractor: China Construction Fifth Building Group

One Shenzhen Bay is a group of skyscrapers in Shenzhen, Guangdong, China. The tallest tower (tower 7) has a height of 341.4 metres (1,120 ft). Construction on tower 7 began in 2014 and the building was completed in 2018.

== Gallery ==
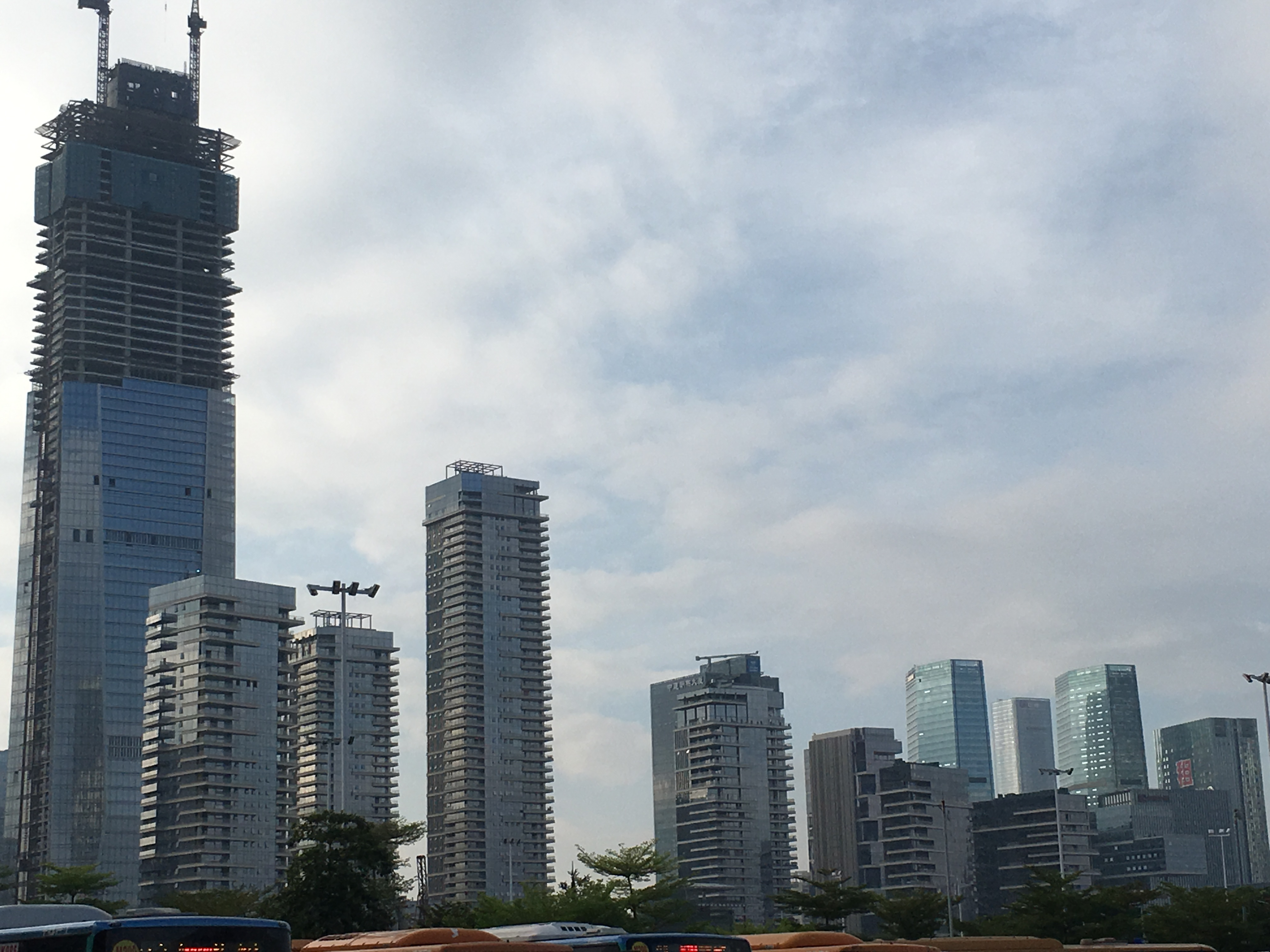
One Shenzhen Bay in construction as of November 2016

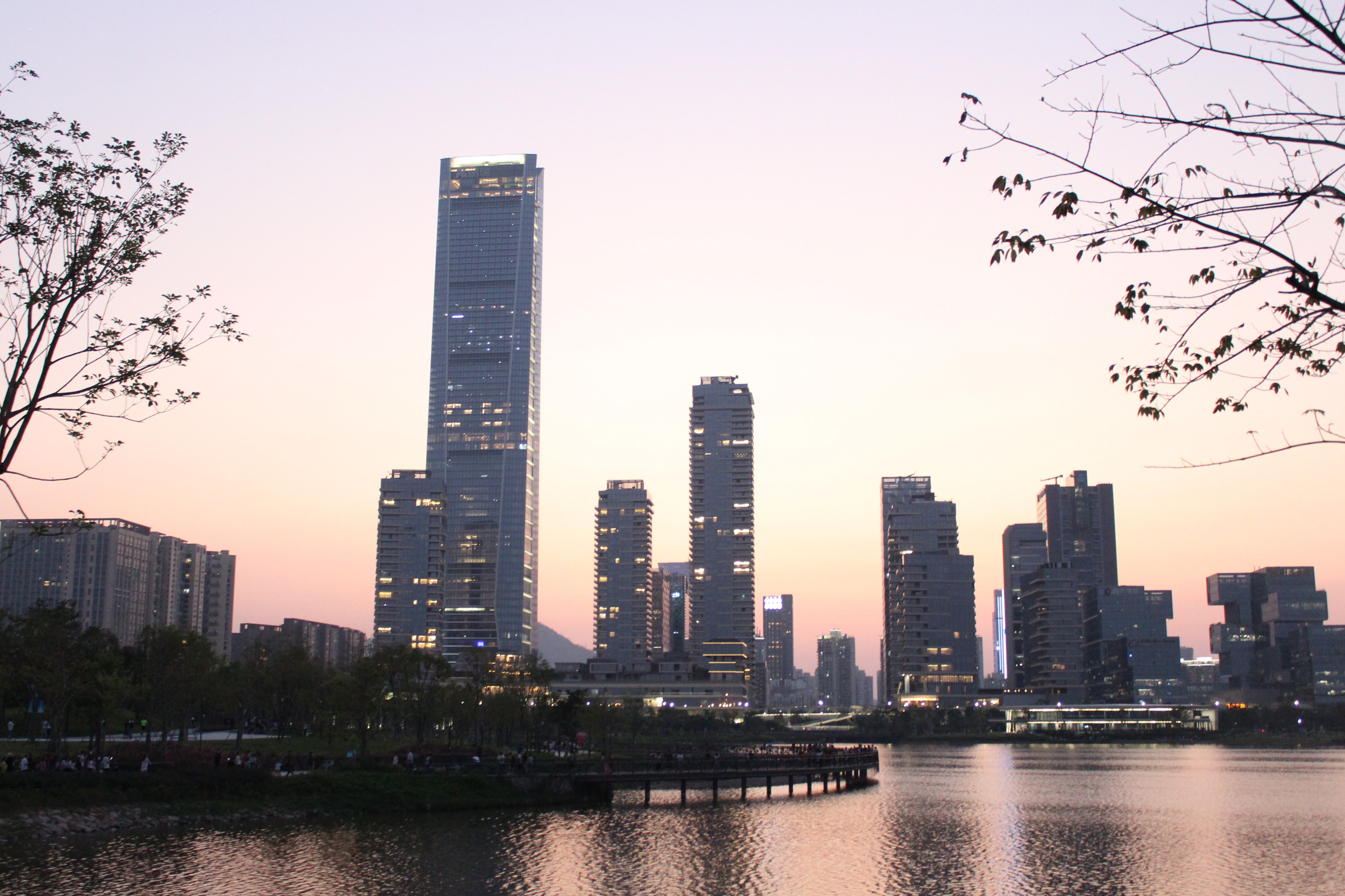
One Shenzhen Bay at dusk

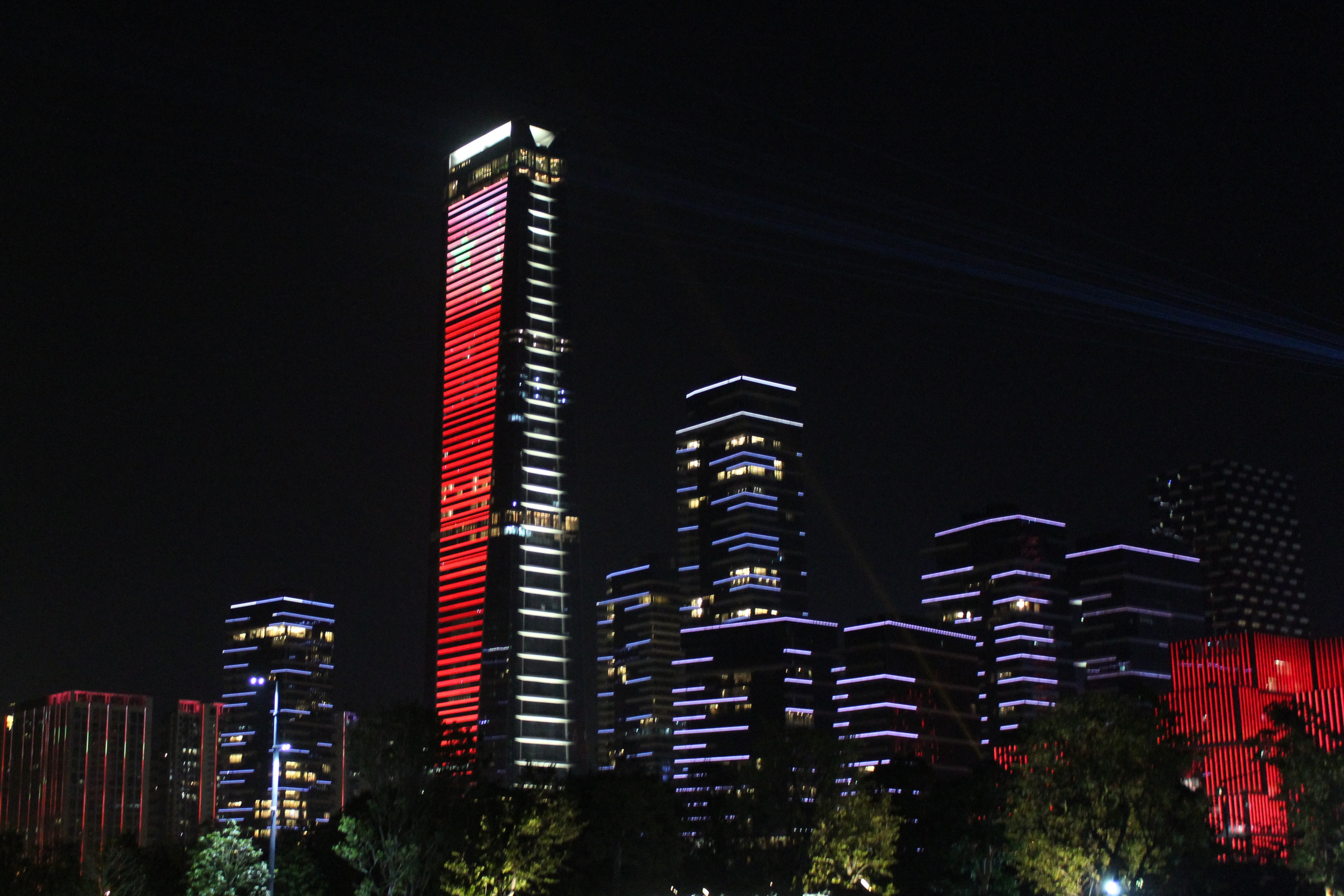
One Shenzhen Bay during the national celebrations

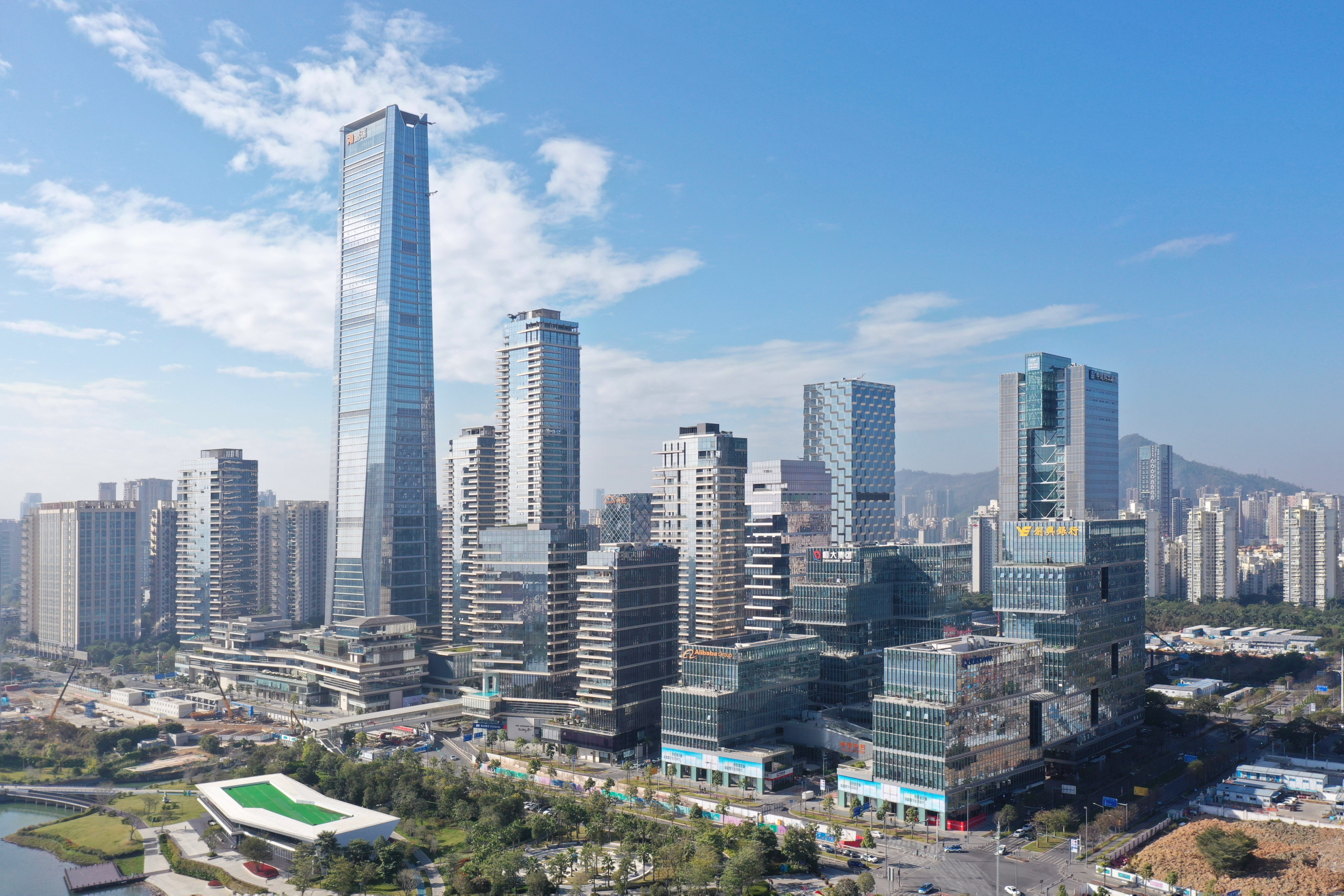
One Shenzhen Bay in 2020

== See also ==
- List of tallest buildings in Shenzhen
- List of tallest buildings in China
