= China Resources =

State-owned corporate group

China Resources Holdings Co., Ltd 华润

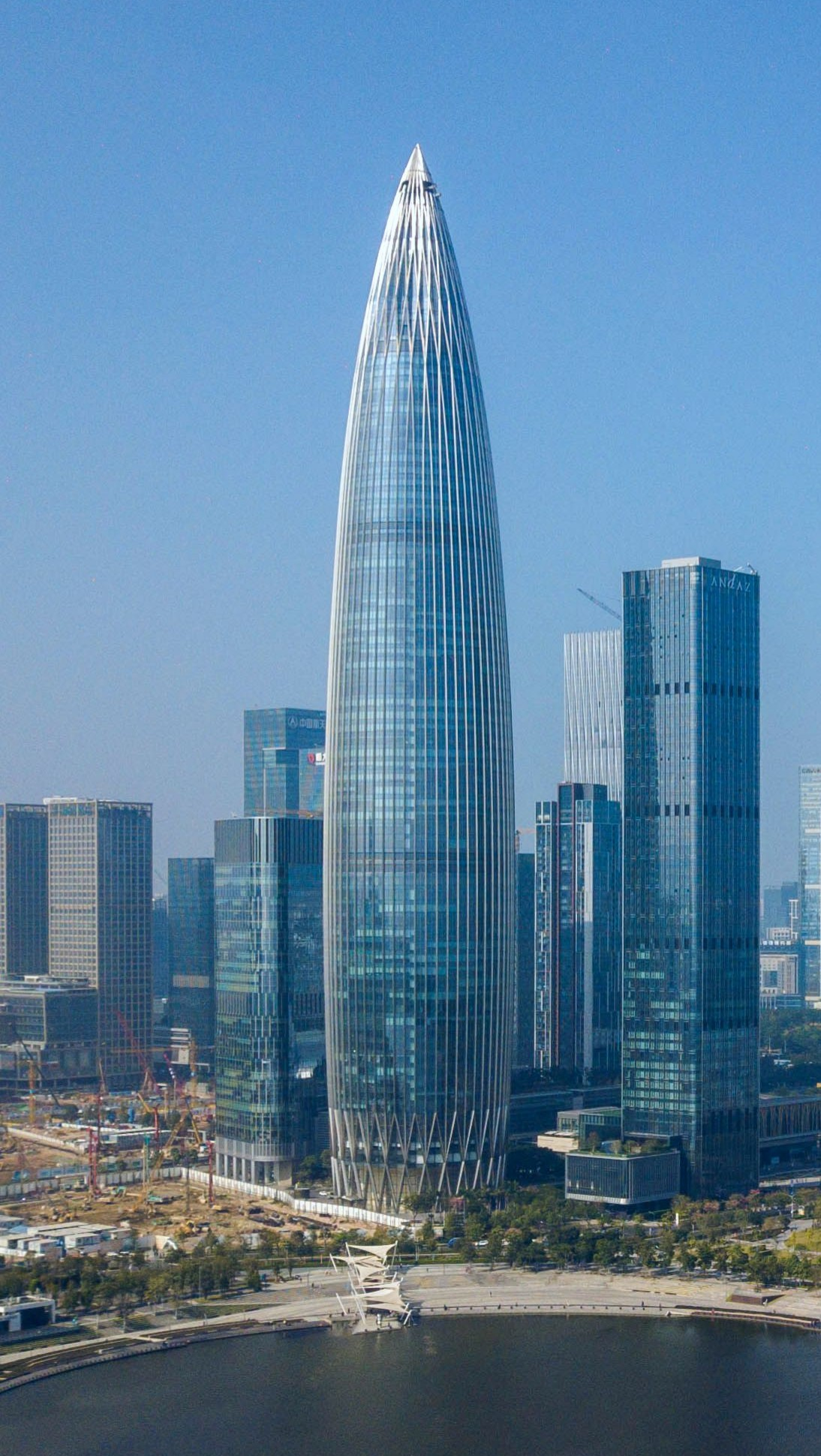
- China Resources Headquarters in the Nanshan District of Shenzhen
- Type: State-owned enterprise
- Industry: Conglomerate
- Founded: 1938; 88 years ago
- Headquarters: China Resources Headquarters; Shenzhen, Guangdong, China
- Area served: Mainland China; Hong Kong
- Key people: Fu Yuning (chairman)
- Revenue: US$ 126.2 billion (2023)
- Net income: US$ 3.797 billion (2023)
- Total assets: US$ 367.0 billion (2023)
- Number of employees: 394,112 (2023)
- Subsidiaries: China Resources Asset Management; China Resources Bank; China Resources Beer; China Resorces Capital; China Resources Cement; China Resources C’estbon; China Resources Land; China Resources Longdation; China Resources Microelectronics; China Resources Ng Fung; China Resources Mixc Lifestyle; China Resources Power; China Resources Vanguard and others.

Chinese name
- Simplified Chinese: 华润
- Traditional Chinese: 華潤
Transcriptions
Standard Mandarin
- Hanyu Pinyin: Huá Rùn
Yue: Cantonese
- Jyutping: Wa4 Yeun6
- Website: www.crc.com.cn

China Resources Holdings Company Limited (Chinese: 华润), or simply China Resources, is a Chinese state-owned conglomerate that owns a variety of businesses in Hong Kong and Mainland China. Some of its subsidiaries use the name in the form of the initialism CRC. In 2024, China Resources ranked 60th on the World's 500 Most Influential Brands List by World Brand Lab. In 2025, China Resources Group ranks 67th in the Fortune Global 500.

== History ==
The company started as Liow & Company (Chinese: 聯和公司) in Hong Kong in 1938. Its original purpose was to raise funds and purchase supplies and equipment for the Eighth Route Army and later People's Liberation Army, then engaged in the Chinese Civil War. It was renamed as China Resources Corporation (華潤公司) in 1948. In 1952, instead of being affiliated to the General Office of the CPC Central Committee, it came under the Central Trade Department (now known as the Ministry of Commerce). In 1983, the company was incorporated as China Resources (Holdings) Company Limited (華潤(集團)有限公司). In December 1999, CR was no longer linked to the Ministry of Foreign Trade and Economic Cooperation, and came under state management.

== Operations ==
The company's main business focus is the export of mainland Chinese products (including energy) to Hong Kong. Its retail operations are organised under the China Resources Retail group, and include Chinese Arts & Crafts; it also runs a number of supermarkets in Hong Kong, originally under the CRC name, but now rebranded as Vanguard. It also owns Ng Fung Hong, the monopoly meat importer into Hong Kong.

China Resources Cement is the largest NSP clinker and cement producer in Southern China by production capacity and the second largest concrete producer in China by sales volume. It was established in 2003 and incorporated in Cayman Islands.

== Rank ==
According to Fortune Magazine, China Resources was ranked 70th on the 2022 Fortune Global 500 list, improved 73 places since 2014.

== Investigation ==
In 2013 the firm and its chairman at the time, Song Lin, who also held high government rank, was reported to be under investigation regarding the purchase of coal mines in Shanxi province for 9.9 billion RMB that did not produce any coal for several years after the acquisition. There are substantial reserves of coal in the mines, but exploiting them requires substantial investments. Meanwhile, coal from newly opened strip mines in Mongolia had depressed the market. The deal raised questions about the leverage that large, state-owned firms had to borrow money at low interest for projects of dubious profitability and about where the money went and why.

== See also ==
- China Resources Alcohol Corporation
- China Resources Beer
- China Resources Beverage
- China Resources Cement
- China Resources Gas (CR Petroleum Company Limited sold to Sinopec 2007)
- China Resources Land
- China Resources Microelectronics
- China Resources Mixc Lifestyle
- China Resources Power
- China Resources Tower
- China Resources Vanguard
- Ng Fung Hong
- Vanke
