= China Resources Land =

Chinese property development company

China Resources Land Limited 华润置地有限公司
- Type: Public
- Traded as: SEHK: 1109; Hang Seng Index component
- Industry: Real estate
- Founded: 1994; 32 years ago
- Headquarters: Shenzhen, China
- Area served: China
- Key people: Wu Xiangdong (Executive director)
- Products: Shopping Mall, Residential community, Office
- Services: Residential development, Property investment, Value added services
- Parent: China Resources
- Subsidiaries: China Resources Mixc Lifestyle
- Website: www.crland.com.hk

China Resources Land Limited is a property developer of China Resources Group. Its business is the development and management of residential and investment properties in Mainland China major cities including Beijing, Shanghai, Shenzhen, Chengdu, Wuhan and Hefei, Hangzhou, Wuxi, Dalian, Ningbo, Changsha, Suzhou, Chongqing and Shenyang. It was listed on the Hong Kong Stock Exchange as red chip stock in 1996.

In June 2024, China Resources Land Limited was among ten companies to receive the (Building and Construction Information) BCI Asia Top 10 Developers Award.

== Background ==
Through its subsidiaries, China Resources Land is engaged in property development, investment and management, and construction and decoration services. China Resources Land's residential projects include Oak Bay, Phoenix City Phase 3, Phoenix Plaza, The Bund Side, Jade City, Phoenix City, Wuhan Phoenix City, Hefei French Annecy and Wuxi Taihu International Community.

== See also ==
- Real estate in China
