= Shenzhen International Holdings =

Chinese logistics company

Shenzhen International Holdings Limited 深圳国际控股有限公司
- Type: State-owned enterprise (Red chip)
- Traded as: SEHK: 152
- Industry: Logistics
- Founded: 2000
- Headquarters: Hong Kong, People's Republic of China
- Area served: People's Republic of China
- Key people: Chairman: Mr. Guo Yuan
- Parent: Shenzhen Investment Holding Corporation
- Website: Shenzhen International Holdings Limited

Shenzhen International Holdings Limited is engaged in the investment, construction and operation of logistics infrastructure facilities, third party logistics services and logistics information services. It is held by Shenzhen Investment Holding Corporation, an investment holding institution owned by the Shenzhen Government and Cheung Kong Holdings.
